= List of high-rise façade fires =

This is a list of high-rise building fires where the flames were seen to involve the façade.

== Notable fires ==
The original dataset used to create this list was found by searching news reports and research literature 1990 to 2019, and it may be biased towards high-profile fires and English-speaking reporting.

Date	Building	City	Country	Images	Deaths	Injuries	Number of floors affected by fire
January 10, 1990	393 Kennedy St	Winnipeg	Canada		0	0	4
January 1, 1991	Mercantile Credit Building	Basingstoke	UK		0	0	3
April 5, 1991	Knowsley Heights	Liverpool	UK		0	0	1
September 6, 1993	Sun Valley Poultry Factory	Hereford	UK		2	0	1
April 11, 1996	Düsseldorf Airport fire	Düsseldorf	Germany		17	62-88	1
October 28, 1996	Motomachi Apartments	Hiroshima	Japan		0	2	12
September 30, 1997	Eldorado Hotel	Reno	USA		0	0	1
June 20, 1998	Palace Station Hotel and Casino	Las Vegas,	USA		0	0	1
June 11, 1999	Garnock Court fire	Irvine	Scotland		1	4	7
June 2, 2002	Tip Top Bakery	Fairfield	Australia		0	1	1
July 29, 2003	Telstar House	London	UK		0	3	4
October 17, 2004	Parque Central Complex	Caracas	Venezuela		0	25	17
February 12, 2005	Windsor Tower (Madrid)	Madrid	Spain		0	7	32
April 15, 2005	2005 Paris fires	9th District, Paris	France		24	48	3rd
August 26, 2005	2005 Paris fires	13th District, Paris	France		7	32	4th
August 30, 2005	2005 Paris fires	3rd District, Paris	France		17	20	3rd
April 21, 2005	Treskowstrasse Pankow Flats	Berlin	Germany		2	3	5
September 23, 2007	Water Club Tower, Borgata Casino Hotel	Atlantic City	USA		0	0	39
January 25, 2008	MGM Monte Carlo Hotel	Las Vegas	USA		0	0	4
May 9, 2008	De Punt fire	De Punt	Netherlands		3	0	1
February 9, 2009	Beijing Television Cultural Center fire	Beijing	China		1	7	44
July 3, 2009	Lakanal House fire	London	UK		6	20	0
August 15, 2009	Kozepszer Street Flats	Miskolc	Hungary		3	0	6
July 6, 2010	Al Kuwait Tower	Sharjah	UAE		0	0	10
September 1, 2010	Wooshin Golden Suites fire	Busan	South Korea		0	5	35
November 14, 2010	4 Rue du Lac Flats	Dijon	France		7	11	1
November 15, 2010	Jiaozhou Road	Shanghai	China		58	71	28
February 3, 2011	Royal Wanxin Hotel	Shenyang	China		0	0	1
January 18, 2012	Al Baker Tower	Sharjah	UAE		0	0	1
April 28, 2012	Al Tayer Tower	Sharjah	UAE		0	0	1
May 14, 2012	Mermoz Tower	Roubaix	France		1	6	17
July 17, 2012	Polat Tower	Istanbul	Turkey		0	0	1
October 6, 2012	Saif Belhasa Building	Dubai	UAE		0	2+	9
November 18, 2012	Tamweel Tower	Dubai	UAE		0	0	1
April 3, 2013	Grozny-City Towers	Chechnya	Russia		0	0	40
April 22, 2013	Al Hafeet Tower 2	Sharjah	UAE		0	0	10
September 21, 2014	Krasnoyarsk Apartments	Krasnoyarsk	Russia		0	0	25
November 25, 2014	Lacrosse Building	Melbourne	Australia		0	0	16
February 21, 2015	The Marina Torch	Dubai	UAE		0	7	60
March 17, 2015	The Franklin Tower	Paris	France		0	0	2
May 19, 2015	Baku Residential Flats	Baku	Azerbaijan		16	63	1
October 1, 2015	Al Nasser Tower	Sharjah	UAE		0	40	26
December 31, 2015	Address Downtown Hotel	Dubai	UAE		0	15	1
March 28, 2016	Ajman One Complex	Ajman	UAE		0	0	1
July 20, 2016	Sulafa Tower	Dubai	UAE		0	0	30
August 19, 2016	Shepherds Court	London	UK		0	1	3
November 9, 2016	Neo Soho Project	Jakarta	Indonesia		0	0	7
December 1, 2016	Al Bandary Tower B	Sharjah	UAE		0	4	1
December 13, 2016	Oceana Adriatic Building	Dubai	UAE		0	0	1
May 3, 2016	Longsheng Building	Nanjing	China		0	0	1
March 2, 2017	Address Residences Fountain Views	Dubai	UAE		0	0	3
June 14, 2017	Grenfell Tower fire	London	UK		72	70	24
August 4, 2017	The Marina Torch	Dubai	UAE		0	0	64/87
February 1, 2018	Yuansheng International	Zhengzhou	China		0	0	20
April 5, 2018	Taksim Ilk Yardim Hospital	Istanbul	Turkey		0	0	14
May 15, 2018	Zen Tower	Dubai	UAE		0	0	15
January 12, 2019	The Boulangerie Hubert (later renamed the Mumbai Cafe)	Paris	France		4	47	1st of 7
February 4, 2019	Neo 200	Melbourne	Australia		0	0	6
February 5, 2019	17 bis rue Erlanger, The drunk lady fire	16th District, Paris	France		10	36	3rd through 9th
March 14, 2019	Kaifeng Apartments	Kaifeng	China		0	0	17
May 27, 2019	Golden Eagle Shopping Mall	Nanjing	China		0	0	1
May 29, 2019	Commercial Building	Luoyang	China		0	0	1
August 14, 2019	Residential Flats	Warsaw	Poland		0	0	10
November 14, 2019	Seine Tower	Paris	France		0	2	1
November 16, 2019	The Cube Student Housing	Bolton	UK		0	2	1
May 5, 2020	Abbco Tower	Sharjah	UAE		0	12	48
July 27, 2020	Business Centre	Ankara	Turkey		0	0	1
August 29, 2020	Madrid Tower Block	Madrid	Spain		0	0	3
October 8, 2020	Apartment Block	Ulsan	South Korea		0	91	33
March 9, 2021	Apartment Building	Shijiazhuang	China		0	0	26
August 29, 2021	Torre dei Moro fire	Milan	Italy		0	0	20
September 21, 2023	The Kimpton Hotel, formerly the Mariner's Club (Tsim Sha Tsui)	Hong Kong	China		0	0	48
September 16, 2022	Lotus Garden China Telecom Building	Changsha, Hunan	China		0	0	42
November 7, 2022	Apartment Building	Dubai	UAE		0	0	35
March 2, 2023	The 2nd green mesh fire at the Kimpton Hotel, formerly the Mariner's Club (Tsim Sha Tsui)	Hong Kong	China		0	2	48
February 22, 2024	2024 València residential complex fire	València	Spain		10	15	14
April 7, 2024	146 rue de Charonne fire	Paris	France		3	0	7th of 12
17 September 2024	Asia of Ivry (fr, Asie d'Ivry) Wholesaler Chinese Pastry, 50 Av. de la Prte d'Ivry	Paris	France		0	2	7th (attic)
December 13, 2024	26 Avenue d'Iéna	Paris	France		0	0	7th
December 24, 2024	GMF Assurances, 1 rue de la Pépinière	Paris	France		0	1	Top flr
January 27, 2025	The 12th District Town Hall	Paris	France		0	0	Top flrs
October 18, 2025	Chinachem Tower	Central, Hong Kong	China		0	4	25
November 26, 2025	Wang Fuk Court fire	Hong Kong	China		168	79	32
Total					375	733	

Plot showing the number of large façade fires worldwide every five years from 1990 to November 2019. Data found from news articles and online.

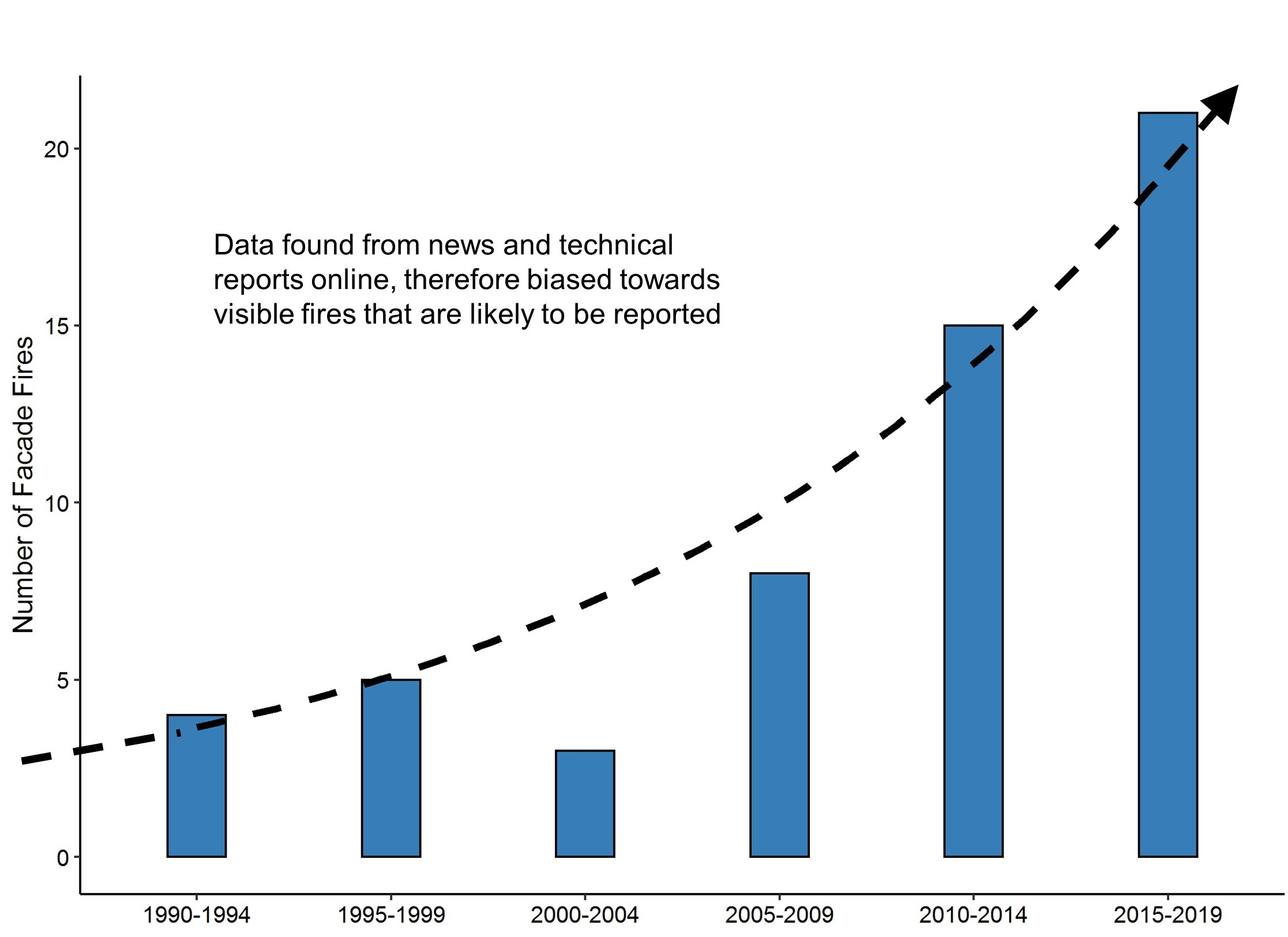
Updated on 08/2020, after Bonner et al., 2020.

== See also ==
- List of building or structure fires
- List of fires in high-rise buildings
