= Freshwater Road fire =

2024 residential fire in East London

- Date: 26 August 2024; 21 months ago
- Time: 02:44 BST (first emergency call)
- Duration: 02:44–11:13 BST (8:29:00)
- Location: Spectrum Building, Freshwater Road, Dagenham, London, United Kingdom; 51.5664°N 0.1336°E
- Type: Structure fire
- Cause: Unknown
- Injuries: 4

The Freshwater Road fire was a fire that broke out in the Spectrum Building, a block of flats on Freshwater Road, Dagenham on 26 August 2024. Four people were injured and treated at the scene with a further two being taken to hospital. Comparisons were immediately drawn to the 2017 Grenfell Tower fire by several news outlets.

== Building ==
The Spectrum Building is a seven-storey block of flats on Freshwater Road in Dagenham, London, United Kingdom. It was originally an office block belonging to the American company DuPont, having been built in 1974 and converted to flats in 2010. The building is 19.7 m (65 ft) tall and has a basement level. In 2017, planning permission was sought to add more floors to the building, bringing the total number of flats to 60 with the addition of a gym. The additional storeys were to be supported by a timber frame. The application was initially rejected but was approved following an appeal in 2018.

=== Cladding and safety issues ===
The developer was aware of safety issues with the building, and residents had reportedly emailed the buildings management company about broken fire doors and risks about cladding on the 5th and 6th floors. The building also lacked sprinklers. A 2020 external wall survey showed that the building did not meet building regulations at the time of construction.

Before the fire the building was in the process of having "non-compliant" cladding removed, due to recommendations made as a result of the 2017 Grenfell Tower fire. The building was also known to have safety issues according to the London Fire Brigade, with an enforcement notice having been issued to the building's management company in April 2023.

== Fire ==
The London Fire Brigade (LFB) received the first call about the fire at 02:44 BST (UTC+1), with the first firefighting crew arriving within five minutes and a second firefighting crew arriving within six minutes. The LFB sent 45 fire engines and about 225 firefighters to the scene. A major incident was declared by the LFB. More than 100 people were evacuated from the building at the time of the incident.

Residents reported there being no fire alarm during the fire and that fire exits were locked.

== Aftermath ==
After the fire the London Fire Brigade called for an investigation, asking how the fire was able to spread so quickly. Cabinet minister Ellie Reeves said that work on affected buildings with non-compliant cladding needed to be "ramped up". Judith Hackitt, who was in charge of reviewing building regulations after the Grenfell Tower fire said that the process of replacing cladding was "passing the buck". A large number of residents were displaced as a result of the fire. On 29 August 2024, the Building Safety Regulator, part of the Health and Safety Executive stated that it was continuing enquiries into the fire.

Barking and Dagenham Council set up a GoFundMe page to raise money for residents affected by the fire. Margaret Mullane, the MP for Dagenham and Rainham said that she would be supporting residents and businesses who had "lost everything". Grenfell United, a resident group established in the wake of the Grenfell tower fire said in a statement that they expected the government to "speed up remediation on unsafe buildings."

The building was demolished in December 2024.

== See also ==
- List of building or structure fires
- Lakanal House fire
