= Knowsley Heights fire =

1991 fire in Merseyside, England

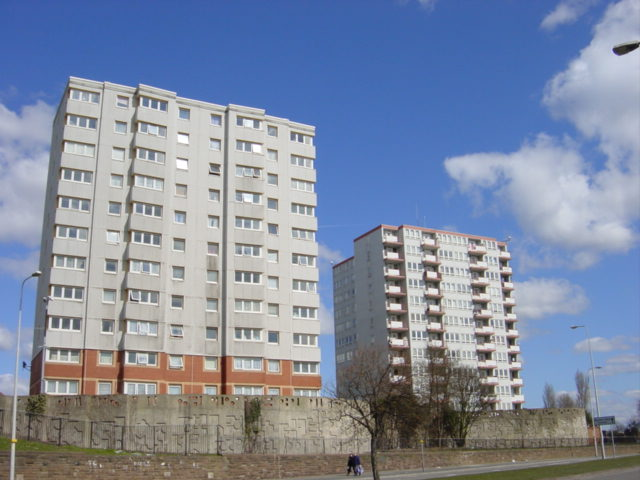
- Knowsley Heights tower block in 2009
- Date: 5 April 1991
- Location: Knowsley Heights, Huyton, Merseyside, England; 53°25′18″N 2°50′38″W
- Type: Structure fire
- Cause: Rubbish fire
- Deaths: 0
- Injuries: 0

The Knowsley Heights fire occurred on 5 April 1991 at the 11-story Knowsley Heights tower block in Huyton, Merseyside. No-one was injured in the fire.

== Fire ==
The fire was deliberately started when rubbish was set alight outside the 11-story Knowsley Heights tower block in Huyton, Merseyside. The flames began at the bottom of the building, and spread through a 90 mm (3.5 inches) gap between the wall and the newly installed rainscreen cladding. The fire spread to all floors of the 11-storey building, causing extensive damage to the walls and windows of the building. The interior of the building did not suffer damage, as the fire did not enter the inside of the building. No-one was injured in the fire.

== Aftermath ==
The Building Research Establishment (BRE) determined that the cladding around Knowsley Heights was a low risk of combustibility. They also highlighted that the building lacked firebreaks. The cladding used in Knowsley Heights was declared legal. The incident was mentioned by BRE for subsequent changes in building regulations.

The Knowsley Heights fire featured in the BBC Two documentary The Fires that Foretold Grenfell, which was first broadcast in October 2018.

== See also ==
- 1973 Summerland disaster
- 1999 Garnock Court fire
- 2005 Harrow Court fire
- 2009 Lakanal House fire
- 2017 Grenfell Tower fire
