= Grenfell Tower fire =

2017 fatal fire in West London

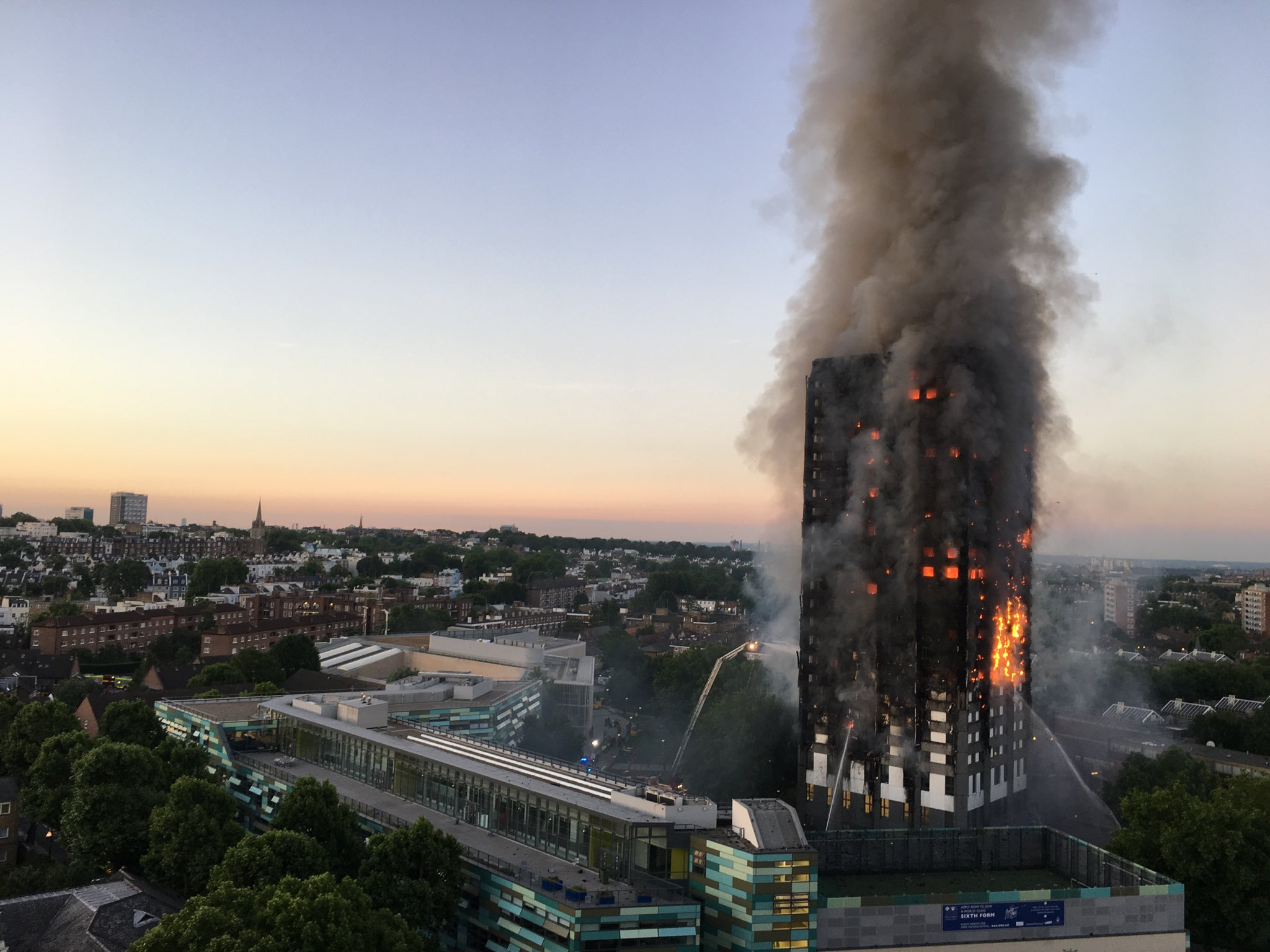
- The fire during the early morning hours of 14 June 2017

- Grenfell Tower (Royal Borough of Kensington and Chelsea) Grenfell Tower (Greater London) Grenfell Tower (the United Kingdom)
- Date: 14 June 2017; 9 years ago
- Time: 00:54 BST (first emergency call)
- Duration: 24 hours (under control); Over 60 hours (fully extinguished)
- Location: Grenfell Tower, North Kensington, London, England; 51.5140°N 0.2158°W; TQ 23907 80957
- Type: Structure fire
- Cause: Electrical fault in a refrigerator; spread of fire largely exacerbated by flammable exterior cladding on the building
- Outcome: Government taskforce taking over parts of the RBKC council function; Urgent fire safety tests on cladding from similar towers; Independent review of building regulations and fire safety commissioned; £200 million pledged from Government to replace similar cladding in other residential towers in England; UK cladding crisis – over £5 billion pledged by government since 2017. Approximate estimates vary from £15 billion to £50 billion; Prosecutors considering police files on 20 organisations and 54 individuals for a variety of possible offenses.
- Deaths: 72
- Injuries: 74 (20 serious)
- Property damage: £200 million – £1 billion (estimated)
- Inquiries: Public inquiry hearings opened 14 September 2017. Final report published 4 September 2024.
- Inquest: Open for all 72 victims; pending police investigation.

On 14 June 2017, a high-rise fire broke out in the 24-storey Grenfell Tower block of flats in North Kensington, West London, England, at 00:54 BST and burned for 60 hours. A total of 70 people died at the scene and two other people died later in hospital, with more than 70 injured and 223 escaping. It was the deadliest structural fire in the United Kingdom since the 1988 Piper Alpha oil-platform disaster and the worst UK residential fire since the Blitz of World War II. It also became the deadliest single residential building fire in modern European history.

The fire was declared a major incident, with more than 250 London Fire Brigade firefighters and 70 fire engines from stations across Greater London involved in efforts to control it and rescue residents. More than 100 London Ambulance Service crews on at least 20 ambulances attended, joined by specialist paramedics from the Hazardous Area Response Team. The Metropolitan Police and London's Air Ambulance also assisted.

The fire is the subject of multiple complex investigations by the police, a public inquiry, and coroner's inquests. Among the many issues investigated are the management of the building by the Kensington and Chelsea London Borough Council and Kensington and Chelsea TMO (the tenant management organisation, which was responsible for the borough's council housing), the responses of the Fire Brigade, other government agencies, deregulation policy, building inspections, adequate budgeting, fire safety systems, the materials used, companies installing, selling and manufacturing the cladding, and failures in communications, advice given or decisions made by office holders. Parliament commissioned an independent review of building regulations and fire safety, which published a report in May 2018. In the UK and internationally, governments have investigated tower blocks with similar cladding. Efforts to replace the cladding on these buildings are ongoing. A side effect of this has been hardship caused by the United Kingdom cladding crisis.

The Grenfell Tower Inquiry began on 14 September 2017 to investigate the causes of the fire and other related issues. Findings from the first report of the inquiry were released in October 2019 and addressed the events of the night. It affirmed that the building's exterior did not comply with regulations and was the central reason why the fire spread, and that the fire service were too late in advising residents to evacuate. A second phase to investigate the broader causes began on 27 January 2020. After extensive hearings, Grenfell Tower Inquiry's final report was published 26 February 2025, as was the Government's response, which accepted the findings and outlined plans to act on all 58 recommendations.

In April 2023, a group of 22 organisations, including cladding company Arconic, Whirlpool and several government bodies, reached a civil settlement with 900 people affected by the fire. In September 2026 police passed files on 20 organisations and 54 individuals to the Crown Prosecution Service for a variety of possible offences, stated to include corporate manslaughter, gross negligence manslaughter, health and safety offences, fraud and fraud-related offences, and misconduct in public office. These include possible charges against the Royal Borough of Kensington and Chelsea, and possible Crown censure of the Ministry of Housing, Communities and Local Government, which as a government department cannot be prosecuted. Decisions on charges are expected by June 2027. The police explained the delay as due to Grenfell being "one of the most complex investigations ever undertaken by any UK law enforcement agency", on a "truly enormous" scale.

The demolition of Grenfell Tower began in September 2025 and is expected to take two years.

== Background ==
Map of the western side of the Lancaster West Estate. The fire also severely affected three low-rise "finger blocks" adjoining Grenfell Tower.

=== Building and construction ===
Grenfell Tower was part of the Lancaster West Estate, a council housing complex in North Kensington. The 24-storey tower block was designed in 1967 by Clifford Wearden and Associates, and the Kensington and Chelsea London Borough Council approved its construction in 1970. The building was constructed by contractors A E Symes of Leyton from 1972 to 1974.

The 220-foot-10-inch (67.30 m) tall building contained 120 one-bedroom and two-bedroom flats. The upper 20 (of 24) storeys were residential floors, with each having a communal lobby and six dwellings, with ten bedrooms among them. The lower four storeys were originally used for non-residential purposes. (Note: The floors were originally numbered Ground, Mezzanine, Walkway, Walkway + 1, Floor 1, Floor 2, ..., Floor 20. After the 2015–16 renovation, the floors were numbered Ground, Floor 1, Floor 2, ..., Floor 23. The flat numbers followed a pattern in which the last digit indicated a flat's position on the floor, and the preceding digits indicated the original number of the floor. Thus Flat 16 was in the northeast corner of Floor 1, and Flat 26 was directly above it. The 2015–2016 renovation changed the floor numbers but not the flat numbers. Therefore Flat 16 was now on Floor 4, the former Floor 1.) Later, two lower floors were converted to residential use, bringing the total to 129 apartments, housing up to 600 people. The original lead architect for the building, Nigel Whitbread, said in 2016 that the tower had been designed with attention to strength following the 1968 Ronan Point disaster and "from what I can see could last another hundred years".

Like many other tower blocks in the UK, Grenfell Tower was designed to be operated under a "stay put policy" in the event of fire. The idea was that if a fire broke out in one flat, thick walls and fire doors would contain the fire long enough for the fire service to bring it under control (compartmentation). Only those in the affected dwelling would be expected to evacuate. The building was designed under the assumption that a full evacuation would never be necessary. There was no centrally activated fire alarm and only a single central staircase. Unlike those in many other countries, UK regulations do not require a second. In 2010, a fire broke out in a lobby and was quickly extinguished.

=== Management ===
Until 1996, Kensington and Chelsea London Borough Council managed its council housing directly. In 1996, the council created Kensington and Chelsea TMO (KCTMO), a tenant management organisation which would manage its council housing stock. KCTMO had a board comprising eight residents (tenants or leaseholders), four council-appointed members and three independent members. The tower was built as council housing, but fourteen of the flats had been bought under the Right to Buy policy. These were occupied by leaseholders, or were privately rented out by them on the open market.

=== Renovation ===
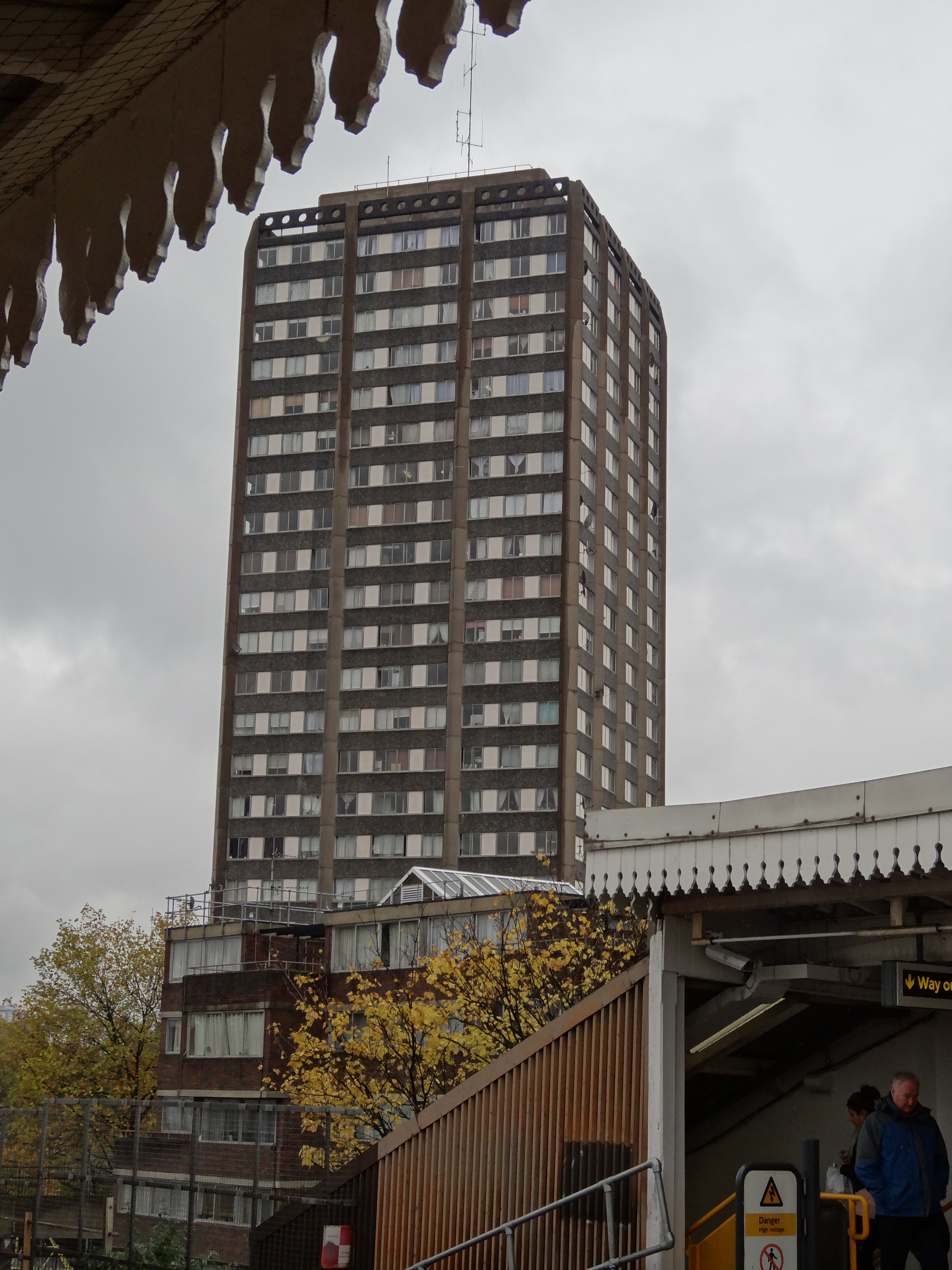
Grenfell Tower in 2012 before the renovation

Grenfell Tower underwent a major renovation, announced in 2012 and conducted over 2015–2016. The tower received new windows, a water-based heating system for individual flats and new aluminium composite rain screen cladding. According to the application, the purpose of the cladding was to improve heating and energy efficiency, and external appearance. Mark Harris, of Harley Facades, said, "from a selfish point of view", his company's preference was to use cheaper aluminium composite material.

Two types of cladding were used: Arconic's Reynobond PE, which consists of two coil-coated aluminium sheets that are fusion bonded to both sides of a polyethylene core; and Reynolux aluminium sheets. Beneath these, and fixed to the outside of the walls of the flats, was Celotex RS5000 PIR thermal insulation. An alternative cladding with better fire resistance was refused due to cost.

The original contractor, Leadbitter, had been dropped by KCTMO because their price of £11.278 million was £1.6 million higher than the proposed budget. The contract was put out to competitive tender and won by Rydon, whose bid was £2.5 million less than Leadbitter's. Rydon carried out the refurbishment for £8.7 million, with Artelia on contract administration and Max Fordham as specialist mechanical and electrical consultants. The cladding was fitted by Harley Facades of Crowborough, East Sussex, at a cost of £2.6 million.

=== Safety concerns ===
Residents had expressed significant safety concerns before the fire. Twelve years earlier, a report had criticised the tower's emergency lighting. The Grenfell Action Group (GAG) ran a blog in which it highlighted major safety problems, criticising the council and KCTMO for neglecting fire safety and building maintenance.

In 2013, the group published a 2012 fire risk assessment by a KCTMO Health and Safety Officer which recorded safety concerns. Firefighting equipment at the tower had not been checked for up to four years; on-site fire extinguishers had expired, and some had the word "condemned" written on them because they were so old. GAG documented its attempts to contact KCTMO management; they also alerted the council's cabinet member for Housing and Property but said they never received a reply. In 2013 the council threatened one of the bloggers with legal action, saying that their posts amounted to "defamation and harassment". Two women living in Grenfell Tower, Mariem Elgwahry and Nadia Choucair, were threatened with legal action by KCTMO after they campaigned for improved fire safety. They later died in the fire, at the ages of 27 and 34.

In January 2016, GAG warned that people might be trapped in the building if a fire broke out, pointing out that the building had only one entrance and exit, and corridors that had been allowed to fill with rubbish, such as old mattresses. GAG frequently cited other fires in tower blocks when it warned of the hazards at Grenfell. In November 2016, GAG characterised KCTMO as an "evil, unprincipled, mini-mafia" and accused the council of ignoring health and safety laws. GAG suggested that "only a catastrophic event will expose the ineptitude and incompetence of [KCTMO]", adding, "[We] predict that it won't be long before the words of this blog come back to haunt the KCTMO management and we will do everything in our power to ensure that those in authority know how long and how appallingly our landlord has ignored their responsibility to ensure the health and safety of their tenants and leaseholders. They can't say that they haven't been warned!" The Grenfell Tower Leaseholders' Association had also raised concerns about exposed gas pipes in the months before the fire. As with the majority of tower blocks in the UK, Grenfell Tower did not have fire sprinklers.

Meanwhile, in June 2016, an independent assessor had highlighted 40 serious issues with fire safety at Grenfell Tower and recommended action to be taken within weeks. In October, the assessor asked the KCTMO why there had been no action taken for more than 20 issues in the June report. In November 2016, the London Fire and Emergency Planning Authority served a fire deficiency notice, listing many fire safety issues at Grenfell Tower that required action from KCTMO by May 2017. Areas of concern identified included fire doors, the smoke venting system and the firefighters' lift controls.

==== Previous cladding fires and responses ====
One of the earliest fires that involved cladding materials was the 1973 Summerland disaster on the Isle of Man, which caused 50 deaths. Part of the reason why the fire spread rapidly through the leisure centre was the acrylic sheeting on the exterior of the building. In the 1991 Knowsley Heights fire, fire spread up the entire height of an 11-storey building due to its exterior cladding, though it did not enter the interior and nobody was injured. In 2009, external composite panels also played a role in the spread of the Lakanal House fire in Southwark. An article in The Guardian three days after the Grenfell Tower fire described it as a "tragedy foretold", highlighting that there had been previous cladding fires such as the 2015 fire at The Marina Torch in Dubai, United Arab Emirates. As a result of the Garnock Court fire in 1999 the Scottish government had ordered the removal of laminate panels and enacted legislation to prevent their installation.

In 2016, a non-fatal fire at a Shepherd's Bush tower block spread to six floors via flammable external cladding. In May 2017, the London Fire Brigade (LFB) warned all 33 London councils to review the use of panels and "take appropriate action to mitigate the fire risk".

== Fire ==
=== Initial fire (00:50–01:15) ===
Spread and timeline of the fire

The fire started in the early hours of Wednesday 14 June 2017 at around 00:50 BST (UTC+1), when a fridge-freezer caught fire in flat 16, on the fourth floor. The flat's resident, Behailu Kebede, was awoken by a smoke alarm. After discovering smoke coming from the fridge freezer in his kitchen, Kebede alerted his lodgers and neighbours, before making a call to the LFB at 00:54. (Note: The inquiry ruled in 2019 that the resident was not to blame.) The first two fire engines ("pumps"), were mobilised from North Kensington Fire Station at 00:55:14 and arrived at 00:59:14 and 00:59:28. The initial incident commander Michael Dowden said that the fire was visible at this point as a "glow" in the window. A further two pumps were also dispatched. Any residents of the tower who called the fire service were told to remain in their flat unless it was affected, which is the standard policy for high-rise fires, as each flat should be fireproofed from its neighbours. Also due to this policy, the building had no central fire alarm.

After most of the firefighters entered the building, a bridgehead (internal base of operations) was set up on the second floor, connecting hoses to the dry riser. They first entered flat 16 at 01:07. It was a further seven minutes before they began tackling the kitchen blaze. At approximately 01:08, the fire began to penetrate the window frame. Within a few minutes, the surrounding cladding panels had also caught on fire. Observing this, the incident commander requested another two pumps and an aerial appliance at 01:13, which triggered the dispatch of more senior officers, a fire investigation unit and two command vehicles. Crew manager (CM) Christopher Secrett at the floor 4 bridgehead and watch manager (WM) Michael Dowden outside had conducted a planning conversation around 01:06. Dowden had noticed the fire breaching the window and offered to spray it with a covering water jet but Secrett was fearful that the resulting steam would scald the two firefighters about to enter the flat.

=== Rapid upward spread (01:15–01:30) ===
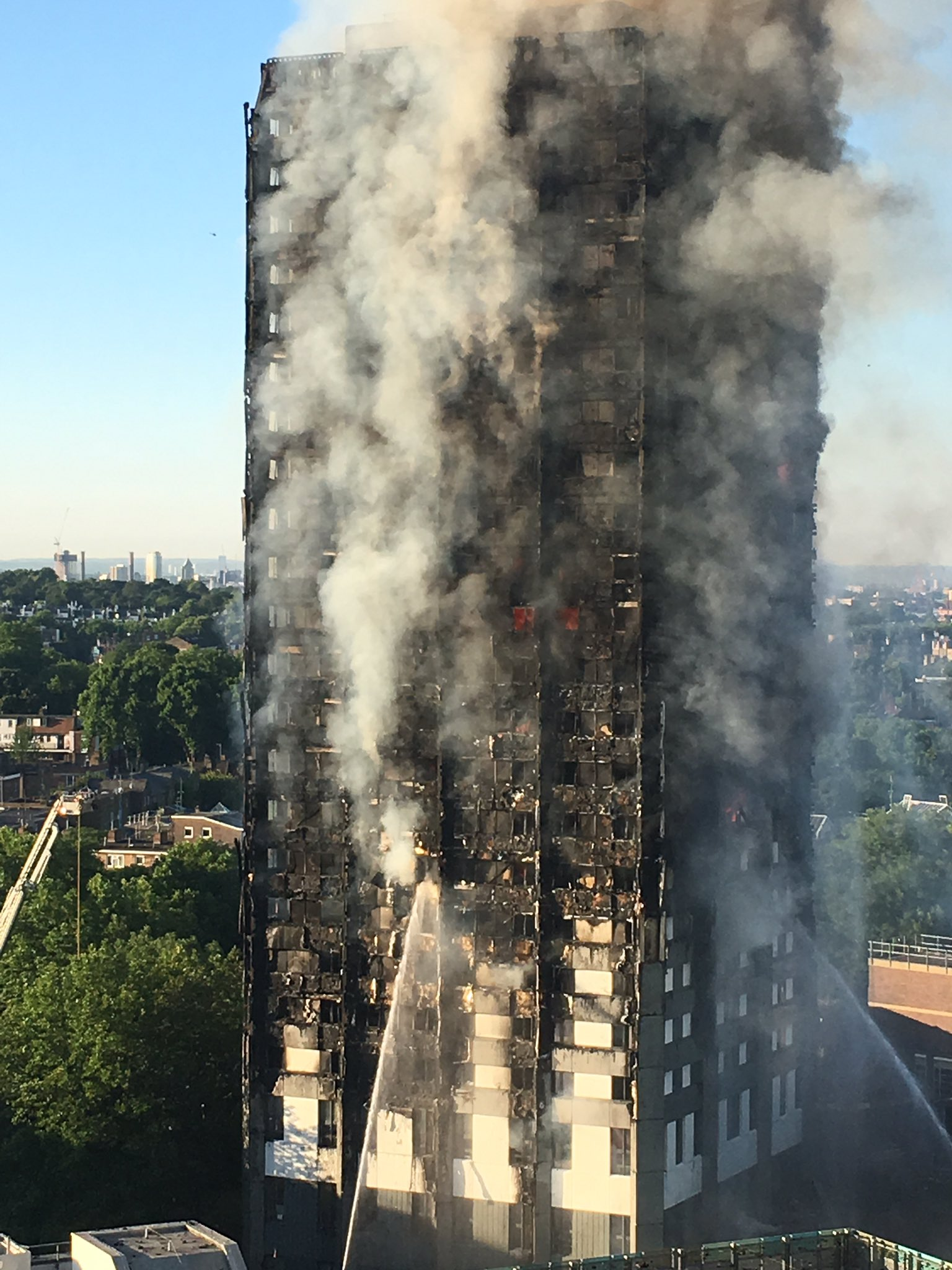
Grenfell Tower in the early morning of 14 June. The burnt cladding is visible on the outside of the building, showing the extent of the rapid upward spread of the fire.

By the time the firefighters began extinguishing the kitchen fire, a column of flames was quickly advancing up the side of the building. At 01:15, a firefighter discovered smoke in flat 26 (directly above flat 16), another discovered residents who had fled smoke on the fifth and sixth floors, and outside large quantities of debris began falling from the burning façade. The flames spread up the side at a "terrifying rate". Attempts to fight the fire with an external jet were unsuccessful, as it was mostly burning behind the waterproof rainscreen. By 01:30, a rising column of flames had reached the roof and the fire grew out of control. The fire on the eastern exterior spread sideways and brought smoke and flames into multiple flats.

By 01:18, 34 of 293 residents had escaped. The busiest phase of evacuations was between 01:18 and 01:38, when 110 escaped, with many awoken by their smoke alarms when smoke entered their flat. Due to Ramadan, many observing Muslim residents were awake for the pre-dawn meal of suhur, which enabled them to alert neighbours.

LFB rapidly escalated its response during this time period. The number of pumps in attendance was raised from six to eight at 01:19, with a specialist fire rescue unit, bulk breathing apparatus carrier and damage control unit being sent too. Pumps were made up to ten at 01:24, then to fifteen at 01:27 along with a second aerial platform. Two minutes later, pumps were made 20 and two more fire rescue units were mobilised, and pumps were made up to 25 at 01:35, also triggering the dispatch of an assistant commissioner. Dany Cotton, the commissioner of the London Fire Brigade, was also called out and began driving to the scene from her home in Kent. (Note: The most senior officers of the London Fire Brigade take it in turns to be on call at night, to respond to a major incident.) The Metropolitan Police Service (MPS) were called at 01:24 to manage the gathering crowd outside. Five minutes later, the London Ambulance Service were also called.

=== Trapped residents and rescue missions (01:30–02:04) ===
Due to fire doors not closing and sealing properly, smoke began to spread from affected flats into the lobbies. By 01:33, LFB were receiving calls from residents who reported being trapped in their flats. At some point between 01:30 and 01:40, smoke began to enter the stairwell. The Inquiry later estimated that despite this, the stairs were still passable for over half an hour. Evacuation rates slowed, with 20 escaping between 01:38 and 01:58. More than half of those still trapped at 01:58 were killed, while 48 were rescued between 01:58 and 03:58. The fire continued to spread sideways on the exterior, and by 01:42 had reached the north side.

LFB call handlers collected information from trapped residents and this was relayed to the LFB's command unit at the scene. Communicating through radio proved difficult, due to noise, the sheer volume of talk and possibly the concrete building structure. Instead, details of trapped residents were written on slips of paper and ferried by runners from the command unit to the bridgehead on the second floor. At the bridgehead, incoming firefighters were assigned flats to go to and briefed on whom they would need to rescue. They donned breathing apparatus and headed to the flats to search for residents.

The firefighters encountered thick smoke, zero visibility and extreme heat when they climbed above the fourth floor. Some residents had moved location to escape the smoke. Three firefighters who went to rescue a 12-year-old girl on the 20th floor were unable to find her; she had moved to a flat on the 23rd floor. Despite being on the phone to an operator, the operator had no means of knowing what the firefighters were doing, and the girl later died in this location. Another two firefighters were sent to a flat on the 14th floor with a single resident, only to find eight people (four of them eventually escaped).

=== Major incident declared (02:04–04:00) ===
As the fire rapidly spread around the building, witnesses on the ground reported seeing trapped residents switching the lights in their flats on and off or waving from windows to attract help, some holding children as well as hearing residents screaming from all sides of the tower. Eyewitnesses reported seeing some people jumping to their deaths, and four victims were later found to have died from "injuries consistent with falling from a height". At least one person used knotted blankets to make a rope and escape from the burning building. Frequent explosions that were reported to be from gas lines in the building were heard.

Outside operations were hindered by falling debris, including burning pieces of cladding. Due to this danger, the police moved crowds away from the building as a safety precaution. The MPS Territorial Support Group was present; besides being a specialist unit for public order policing, they provided riot shields to protect firefighters from falling debris.

Shortly after 02:00, a major incident was declared and the number of fire engines was raised from twenty five to forty and the number of fire-rescue units increased to ten, command vehicles to six, aerial platforms to four, and operational support units to two. Over the course of the operation, 250 firefighters attempted to control the blaze, with more than 100 firefighters inside the building at a given time. Assistant commissioner Andy Roe assumed direct command of firefighting operations for the next 11 hours. Rather than command the operations directly, commissioner Cotton served as a monitoring officer, overseeing Roe and providing moral support to firefighters. She said that LFB had broken their own safety protocols by entering a large building without knowing whether it was in danger of structural collapse. It was not until the following afternoon that structural engineers were able to assess the structure and determine that it was not in danger of collapse.

By 02:20, the level of smoke in the stairwell constituted a threat to life, although some survivors did escape beyond then. At 02:47 the "stay put" policy, advising those residents in areas unaffected by the blaze to remain there, was abandoned in favour of general evacuation. After this point only 36 additional residents were able to escape. Experts on the subsequent inquiry into the disaster later said that the "stay put" policy should have been discarded an hour and twenty minutes sooner.

=== Final rescues (04:00–08:07) ===
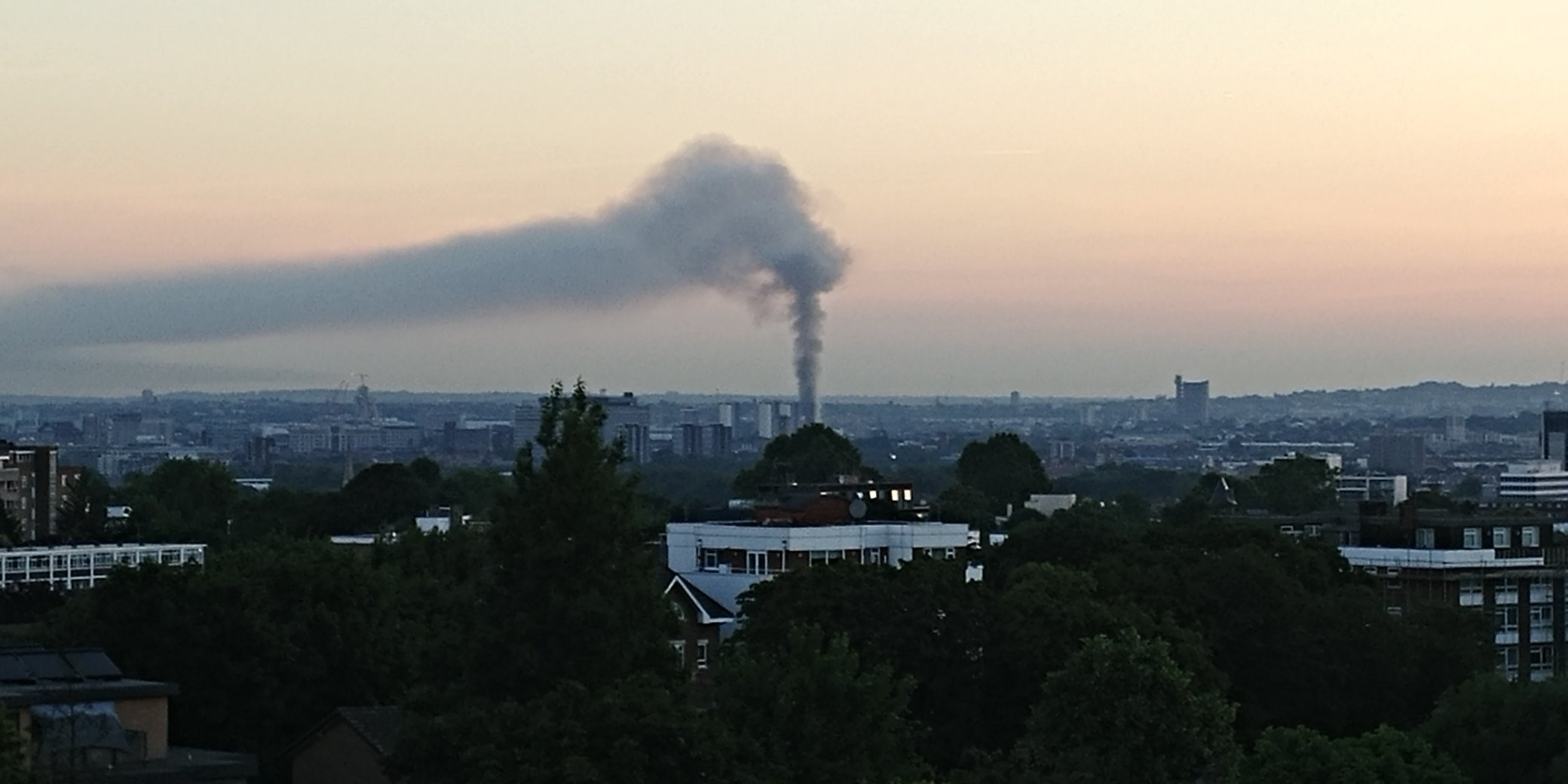
Grenfell fire seen at 04:51 on 14 June from Putney Hill, London

By sunrise, firefighters were still busy fighting the fire and attempting rescues on the inside. At 04:14, police addressed the large crowd of onlookers and urgently instructed them to contact anyone they knew who was trapped in the building—if they were able to reach them via phone or Twitter—to tell them they must try to self-evacuate and not wait for the fire brigade. By 04:44, all sides of the building had been affected.

Only two further rescues took place, with one resident being rescued at 06:05 and the last being rescued at 08:07. Firefighters rescued all remaining residents up to the tenth floor and all but two up to the 12th floor, but none got higher than the 20th floor during this time. Only two people escaped from the highest floor; 24 others, several of whom were inhabitants of lower floors who sought refuge with neighbours, died on this floor.

=== Residual fire (08:07 – 16 June) ===
At a news conference in the afternoon of 14 June, LFB reported firefighters had rescued 65 people from the building and reached all 24 floors. Seventy-four people were confirmed by the NHS to be in six hospitals across London with 20 of them in critical care.

The fire continued to burn on the tower's upper floors. It was not brought under control until 01:14 on 15 June and firefighters were still damping down pockets of fire when the Brigade issued an update on 16 June. The fire brigade also used a drone to inspect the building and search for casualties. The fire was declared extinguished on the evening of 16 June.

== Reporting ==
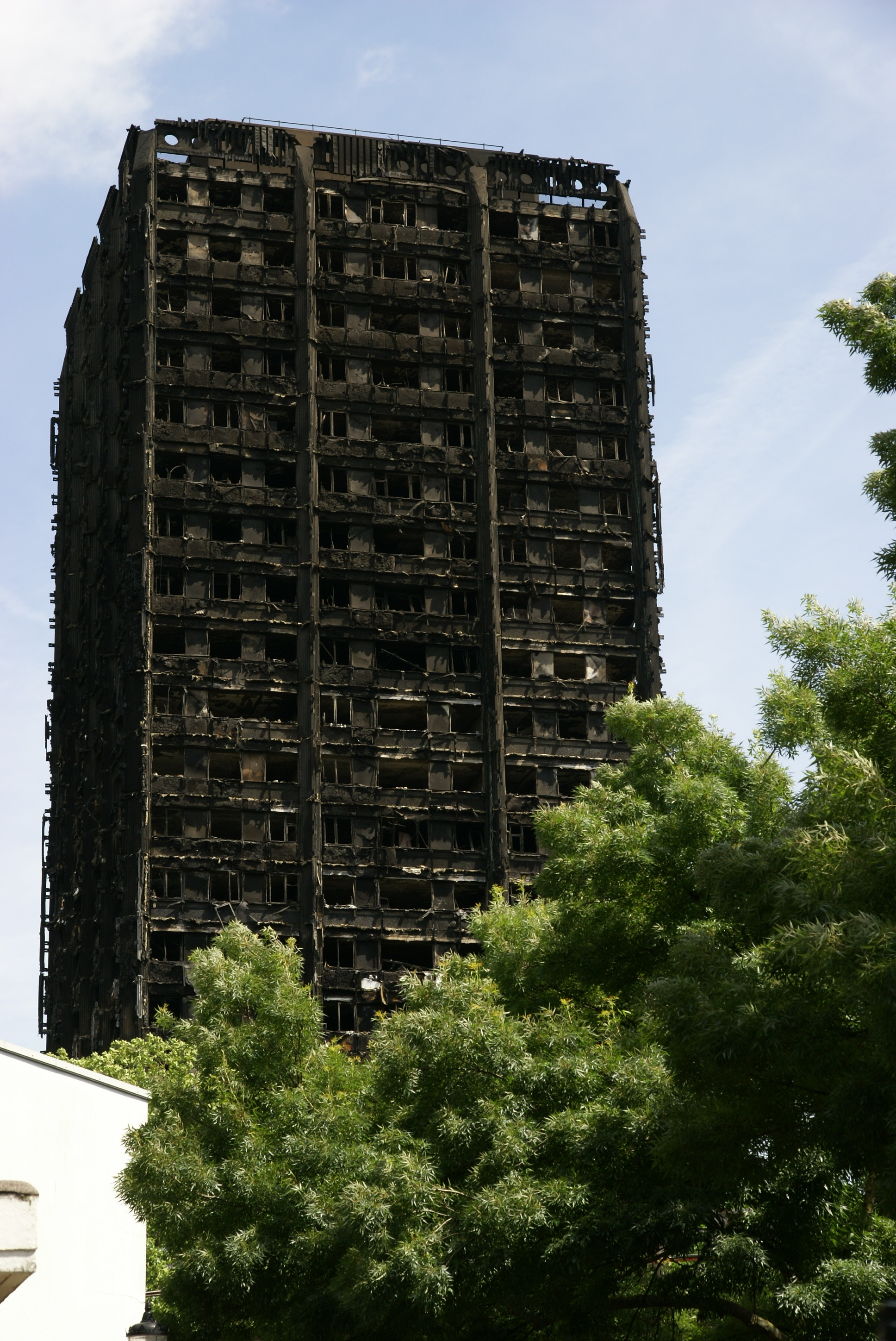
Grenfell Tower two days after the fire broke out

By 05:00 on 14 June, police reported that several people were being treated for smoke inhalation. By 06:30, it was reported that 50 people had been taken to five hospitals: Chelsea and Westminster Hospital, King's College Hospital, Royal Free, St Thomas's, and St Mary's Hospital.

The first reports of fatalities were made by 09:30 by London Fire Commissioner Dany Cotton; she could not specify how many had been killed because of the size and complexity of the building, saying: "This is an unprecedented incident. In my 29 years of being a firefighter, I have never ever seen anything of this scale."

By 12:00 the Metropolitan Police announced there were six people confirmed dead, and more than 70 in hospital, with 20 in critical condition. The first person announced dead was Mohammed al-Haj Ali, a Syrian refugee. A large number of people were reported missing. At around 17:00, the number of confirmed deaths was increased to 12.

=== False accounts ===
In the immediate aftermath of the fire, a number of unsubstantiated reports about casualties circulated online, which were later debunked, including that the government had covered up details of the fire and babies' miraculous survival stories. A later investigation by the BBC's Newsnight programme found no evidence that these survival accounts were credible: neither the Metropolitan Police, London Ambulance Service nor any A&E departments were able to find any record of this happening.

== Impact ==
=== Deaths ===
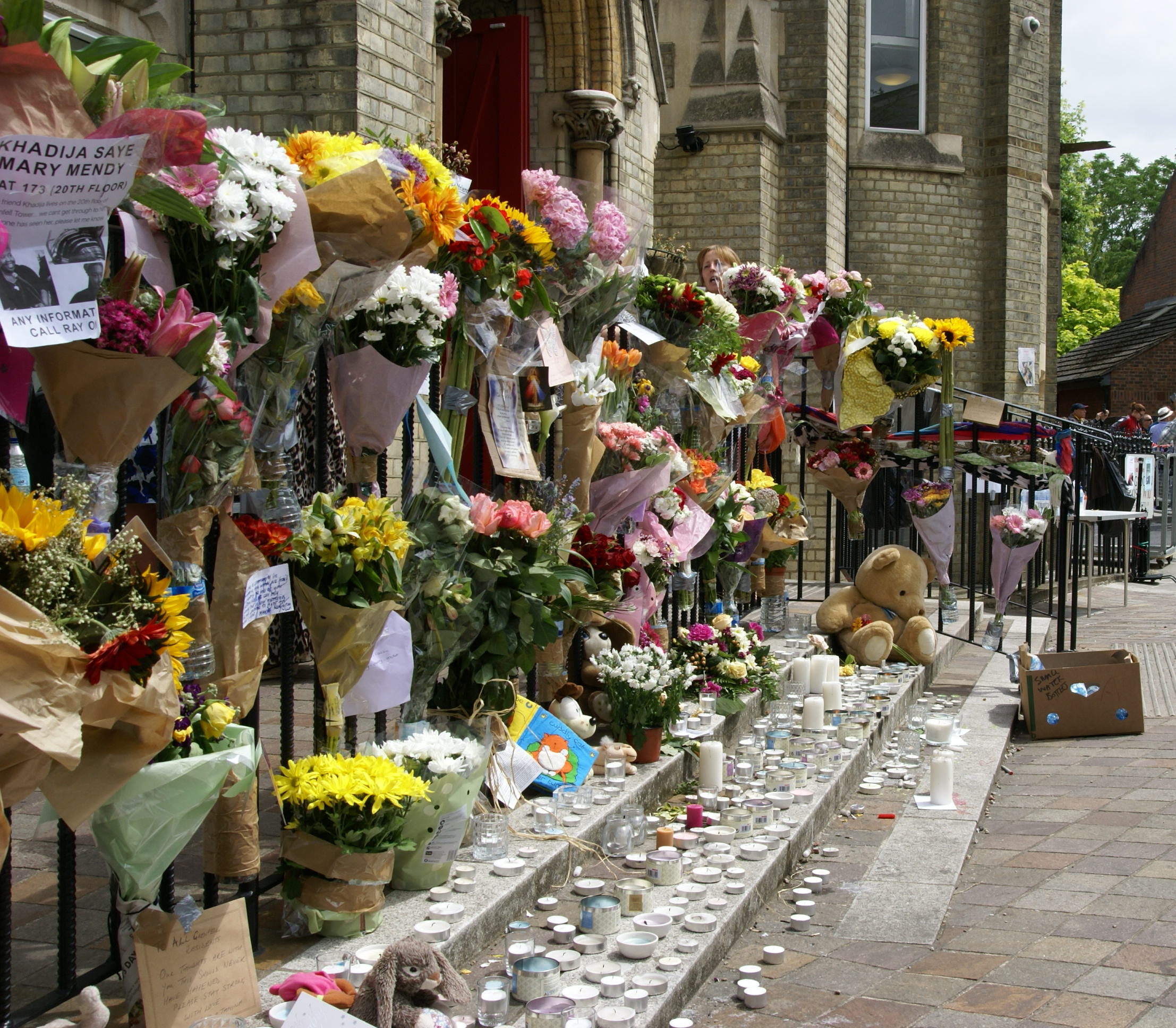
Floral tribute with candles for the victims of the Grenfell Tower fire outside Notting Hill Methodist Church on 16 June 2017

The fire caused 72 deaths, including one who died in the hospital a day later and another who died in January 2018. The latter occurred after an official death toll was announced by police in November 2017. The incident ranks as the deadliest structural fire in the United Kingdom since the 1988 Piper Alpha disaster and the worst UK residential fire since the Second World War.

The dead included many children, five of whom were students at the nearby Kensington Aldridge Academy. The youngest of those known killed, Leena Belkadi, was 6 months old. One victim died in hospital on 15 June 2017 due to inhalation of fire fumes. Additionally, one then-pregnant survivor lost her baby through stillbirth as a result of the fire.

Survivors came from 106 of the tower's 129 flats; eighteen people among the occupants of these flats were reported as dead or missing presumed dead, whereas most of those killed were said to have been in the remaining 23 flats between the 11th and 23rd floors. Some people from lower floors may have tried to move up the building, and it is thought a number of people may have ended up in one flat.

==== Identification of victims ====
Police examined the remains of Grenfell Tower and used "every imaginable source" of information "from government agencies to fast food companies" to identify casualties. Their analysis of CCTV evidence concluded that 223 people (of 293 present) had escaped. This investigation took five months, with only 12 fatalities being identified on the actual day of the fire. By the following week, police had estimated that 80 people had died. This was the most widely quoted estimate in the media for several months. Some victims were identified from 26 calls to 999 made from inside the 23 flats.

On 19 September 2017, Metropolitan Police Commander Stuart Cundy suggested that the number of dead could be lower than 80 because eight people were being investigated for making fraudulent financial claims for non-existent victims. By 1 June 2018, this had led to five people being convicted of fraud. Obstacles to identifying fatalities included the fact there was no formal register of who was in the building, and the number of undocumented subtenants, migrants, and asylum seekers who were believed to have been living there. Mayor Sadiq Khan called for an amnesty to ensure that people with pertinent information could come forward.

The first coroner's inquests opened on 23 August 2017 and all other inquests were opened by 23 November 2017.

In the aftermath of the fire, members of the local community, including a residents' group called Grenfell United, stated that the official figures were far short of existing estimates, with some believing that the death toll was "in hundreds". Ten days after the fire, only 18 deaths had yet been officially recorded, compared to the estimate of 80 and the eventual figure of 72.

=== Psychological health and human factors ===
Beyond physical injury, the fire was a traumatic event which had a psychological impact on residents, emergency service workers, and the public at large.

On 26 July 2017, at the fourth public meeting of the Grenfell Response Team, a local volunteer reported that there had been at least 20 suicide attempts in north Kensington since the fire, one of which had been completed. The mental health of many survivors was damaged.

LFB Commissioner Dany Cotton defended the heroism of emergency service workers who themselves were affected by trauma. An on-call counsellor was made available. Around 80 firefighters and Met Police officers were reported to be suffering from their experiences. Cotton told LBC Radio that she too was undergoing counselling.

An extra four full-time counsellors were employed (reversing previous staff reductions) and 60 volunteer counsellors were brought in. All firefighters who attended Grenfell were given a psychological health check. The BBC reported that LFB used its reserve budget to bring counselling staff back to 2008 levels.

In July 2017, NHS England issued an open letter to GPs giving advice on symptoms for mental health conditions such as post-traumatic stress disorder (PTSD) that those affected by this fire (or recent terrorism) may be experiencing. It is estimated that 67% of people caught up in the fire, lost relatives, or were rescued or evacuated from the tower, need treatment for PTSD. Further, between 26% and 48% of people living nearby who were not evacuated but witnessed the fire have PTSD. It is unclear how far this indicated reaction to the fire and how far previously existing psychiatric conditions were being uncovered.

The Metropolitan Police Service assigned 250 detectives to the fire, placing additional workload and personal stress on a force that was also investigating recent terrorist incidents, including the London Bridge and Finsbury Park attacks.

Psychologists worked at Kensington Aldridge Academy to support students returning to the original site. Measures have been taken to protect student welfare, such as shielding classroom windows overlooking the tower.

=== Long-term physical health ===
On 21 September 2018, the coroner, Fiona Wilcox, expressed concern for the long-term physical health of victims and emergency service workers exposed to smoke and dust inhaled during the fire and subsequent clean-up. Those affected could be at increased risk of conditions such as cancer, asbestosis, COPD, and asthma. The tower is known to have contained asbestos and other toxins. In her letter to NHS chief executive Simon Stevens, Wilcox notes that firefighters involved in the 11 September attacks suffered significant health problems from smoke inhalation. She asked for a physical health screening programme to be established to help prevent future deaths.

Public Health England have been monitoring the quality of the air around the derelict tower. In a March 2019 report, they stated that "the risk to public health from air pollution remains low". While the fire itself released many toxic chemicals, they were quickly dispersed in the wind. There has not been a full assessment of the risk posed by soil contamination. Also in March 2019, an independent study led by Professor Anna Stec reported in the journal Chemosphere that research had uncovered "significant environmental contamination" in the soil and buildings around the local area, including significant concentrations of benzene, benzo(a)pyrene, phosphorus, and polycyclic aromatic hydrocarbons. Chemicals in the soil are unlikely to seep into the air, but could be uncovered if the soil is disturbed. Stec said her findings showed "the need for further in-depth, independent analysis to quantify any risks to residents".

=== Costs ===
Grenfell Tower was insured by Protector Forsikring ASA for £20 million, but the direct costs of the fire are two orders of magnitude higher. In 2023, The Guardian estimated the total cost at almost £1.2 billion, most of it borne by the state. This estimate includes:

- £469 million paid by the tower's owner, the Royal Borough of Kensington and Chelsea, mainly for re-housing the survivors
- £291 million allocated by the British government for costs associated with the site and its conversion to a memorial
- £231 million for the public inquiry and the police investigation, both still ongoing as of the time of the estimate
- £150 million obtained in compensation through civil court proceedings by survivors and family members of the deceased
- £47 million allocated by the cladding manufacturer Arconic for settling civil claims, as well as £35 million paid to Arconic's lawyers and advisers
- £27 million set aside for civil claims by the main building contractor, Rydon
- £14.5 million spent on legal fees by the London fire brigade

This means that the direct costs of the fire are about 4,000 times higher than the £293,368 saved by the tower's builders by using combustible instead of non-combustible cladding.

== Aftermath ==
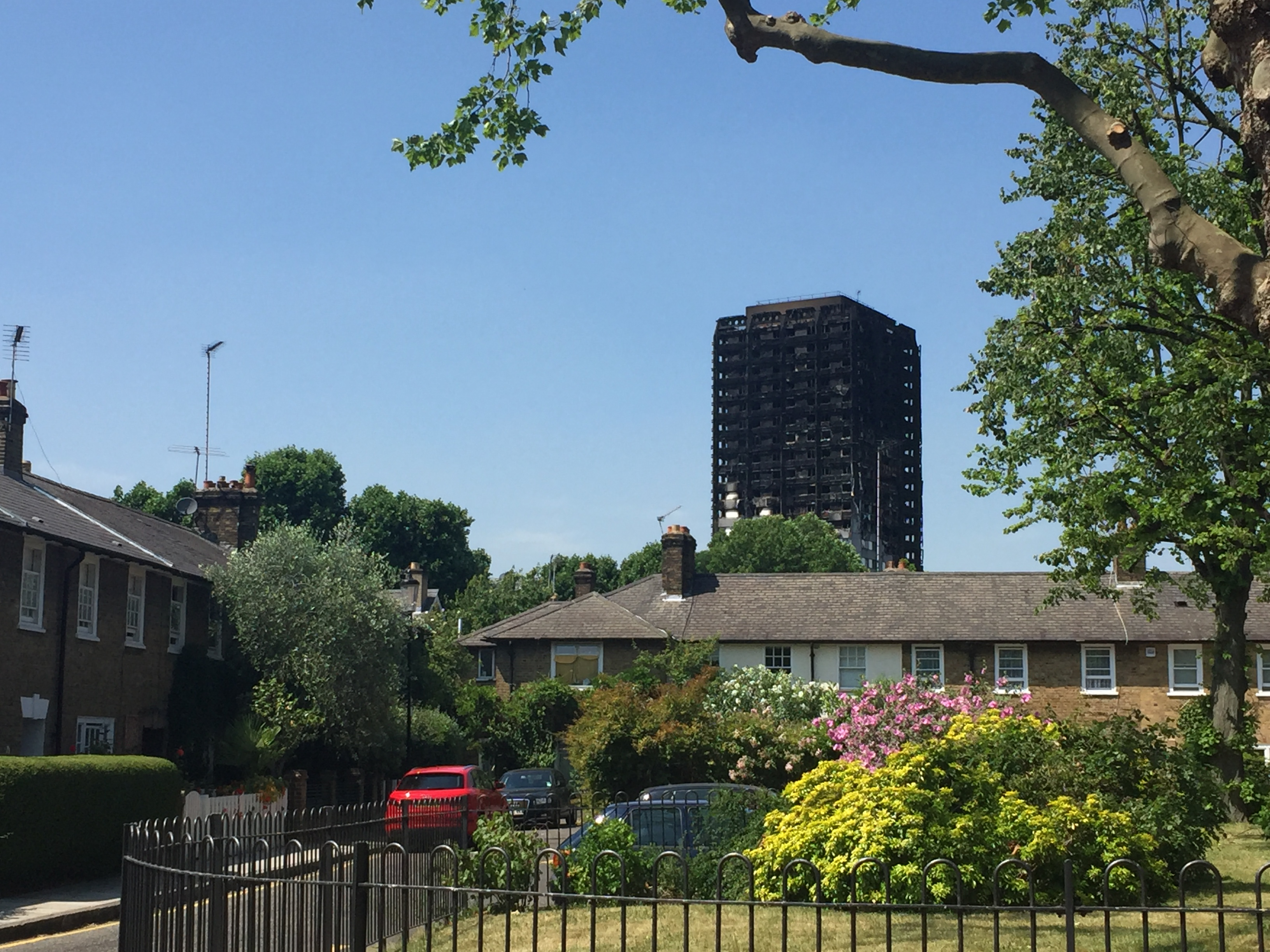
Charred remains of the tower after the fire

A total of 151 homes were destroyed in the tower and surrounding area. People from surrounding buildings were evacuated due to concerns that the tower might collapse.

The fire also severely affected three low-rise "finger blocks" adjoining Grenfell Tower. Their residents were evacuated due to the fire. The blocks, Barandon Walk, Testerton Walk and Hurstway Walk, also lost access to hot water as they shared a boiler beneath Grenfell Tower that was destroyed in the fire.

== Direct causes ==
=== Refrigerator ===
On 23 June, police confirmed that the fire had started in a faulty Hotpoint FF175B fridge-freezer, manufactured by Hotpoint Indesit, in flat 16. Owners of models FF175BP and FF175BG were urged to register their appliance with the manufacturer to receive any updates. Sixty-four thousand of these models were made between March 2006 and July 2009, after which the model was discontinued. It is unknown how many are still in use.

The Department for Business, Energy and Industrial Strategy (BEIS) commissioned a product safety investigation into the Hotpoint FF175B fridge-freezer. Independent experts examined the remains of the appliance recovered from Grenfell and exemplar models of the same type. They concluded that the design met all legal safety requirements, and there was no need to issue a recall of the model. The Consumers' Association complained that the legal requirements were inadequate.

Tenants had repeatedly complained about electrical power surges causing appliances to smoke, and such a surge may have set the fridge-freezer on fire. The local authority knew about complaints and had paid tenants compensation for damaged appliances. Nonetheless, the surges continued. Judith Blakeman, a local Labour councillor, said the surges affected many appliances including fridges. In July 2017, Blakeman said the cause of the surges had not been found.

On 27 November 2018, testifying to the Grenfell Tower inquiry, J. Duncan Glover, an electrical engineer, provided results from his investigation that, building on results from other investigators, found the fire in flat 16 likely started within the "large" fridge-freezer (Hotpoint FF175B), near its compressor. In particular, he identified at least one instance where wires in the compartment housing the compressor's relays were not crimped tightly enough to an electrical connector to form a connection that could handle the current flow. In his view, this substandard connection created additional electrical resistance in the compressor circuit, leading to overheating that ignited the insulation of wires, causing a short circuit. (The wire insulation was PVC, which Glover said is typically rated only to temperatures of about 90 °C (194 °F).) The resulting fire then spread beyond the fridge and continued to grow. Contrasting US and UK safety standards, Glover noted during questioning that US regulations require fridges to have a metal backing, such as steel, which would help contain a fire within the unit, whereas in the UK fridges are permitted to have a plastic backing, which may fuel such a fire.

Glover also testified that the post-fire state of the circuit breaker box (a.k.a. consumer unit) in flat 16 was consistent with the fire starting in the fridge-freezer: The circuit breaker for the fridge-freezer's circuit was found to have tripped off, he said, but with the exception of an RCCB device, all other breakers had remained on. (He noted that it was helpful to his investigation that an occupant of flat 16, Behailu Kebede, shut off the flat's main power switch shortly before vacating the building, thus preserving the state the circuit breakers were in shortly after the fire broke out.) As for the RCCB device, it had been wired to provide ground-fault protection to two circuits, one of which powered the fridge-freezer (both circuits also had standard circuit breakers). However, as Glover explained, the RCCB was designed to protect against a short to ground, not a short to neutral, as occurred in the fridge-freezer. He concluded that the RCCB unit's activation was due instead to a short to ground in the other circuit — a short likely caused by smoke and soot from the fire permeating an AC socket (outlet) elsewhere in the flat. That short circuit, he said, must have occurred after the breaker for the fridge-freezer's circuit had already tripped off.

=== Exterior cladding and insulation ===
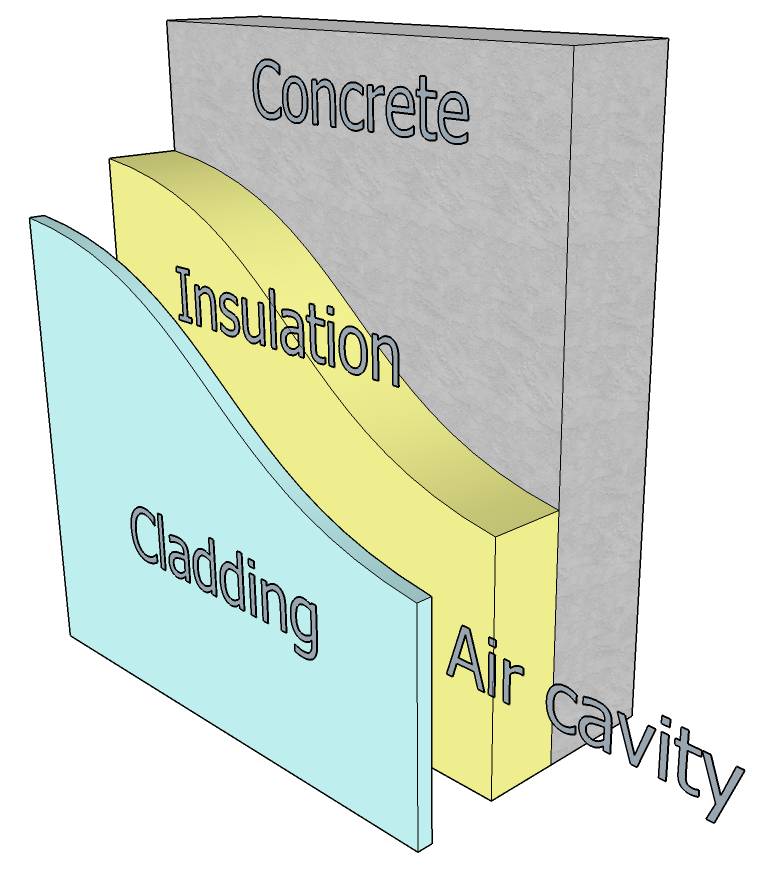
Anatomy of Grenfell Tower cladding. The structure consists of 3 mm (0.12 in) cladding (Reynobond PE), 50 mm (2.0 in) ventilated cavity, 150 mm (5.9 in) insulation (Celotex RS5000) and 250 mm (9.8 in) existing concrete.

The newly renovated façade of the tower is believed to have been built as follows:

- exterior cladding: aluminium sandwich plates with polyethylene core (3 mm (0.12 in) each)
- a standard ventilation gap (50 mm (2.0 in)) between the cladding and the insulation behind it
- an insulation made of PIR (polyisocyanurate) foam plates (150 mm (5.9 in)) mounted on the existing facade
- the existing prefabricated reinforced-concrete facade
- new double-glazed windows of unknown type and material, mounted in the same vertical plane as the PIR foam insulation plates

Both the aluminium-polyethylene cladding and the PIR insulation plates failed fire safety tests conducted after the fire, according to the police.

Earlier in 2014, safety experts had cautioned that the planned insulation was only suitable for use with non-combustible cladding. The Guardian saw a certificate from the building inspectors' organisation, Local Authority Building Control (LABC), which stated that the chosen insulation for the refit should only be used on tall buildings with fibre cement panels, which do not burn. Combustible panels with polyethylene were put up on top of insulation known as Celotex RS5000, made from polyisocyanurate, which burns when heated, giving off toxic cyanide fumes. Despite the above, the Royal Borough of Kensington and Chelsea certified the Grenfell tower building work as allegedly conforming to "the relevant provisions". Council building inspectors visited the site 16 times from August 2014 to July 2016. Kooltherm, a phenolic insulation, was also used on Grenfell. Kooltherm was never tested with polyethylene core aluminium panels according to the manufacturer. The manufacturer, Kingspan, "would be very surprised if such a system ... would ever pass the appropriate British Standard 8414 large-scale test". Kooltherm's LABC certificate states phenolic products, "do not meet the limited combustibility requirements" of building regulations.

The combustible materials used on Grenfell Tower were considerably cheaper than non-combustible alternatives would have been. There appear to have been intense cost pressures over the Grenfell refurbishment. In June 2017, it was stated the project team chose cheaper cladding that saved £293,368, after the Kensington and Chelsea Tenant Management Organisation mentioned in an email the need for "good costs for Cllr Feilding-Mellen [the council's former deputy leader]".

A building control officer from the Royal Borough of Kensington and Chelsea reportedly passed the cladding on Grenfell Tower on 15 May 2015, though there was a nationwide warning that the combustible insulation used should only be used with cladding that does not burn.

==== Aluminium–polyethylene cladding ====
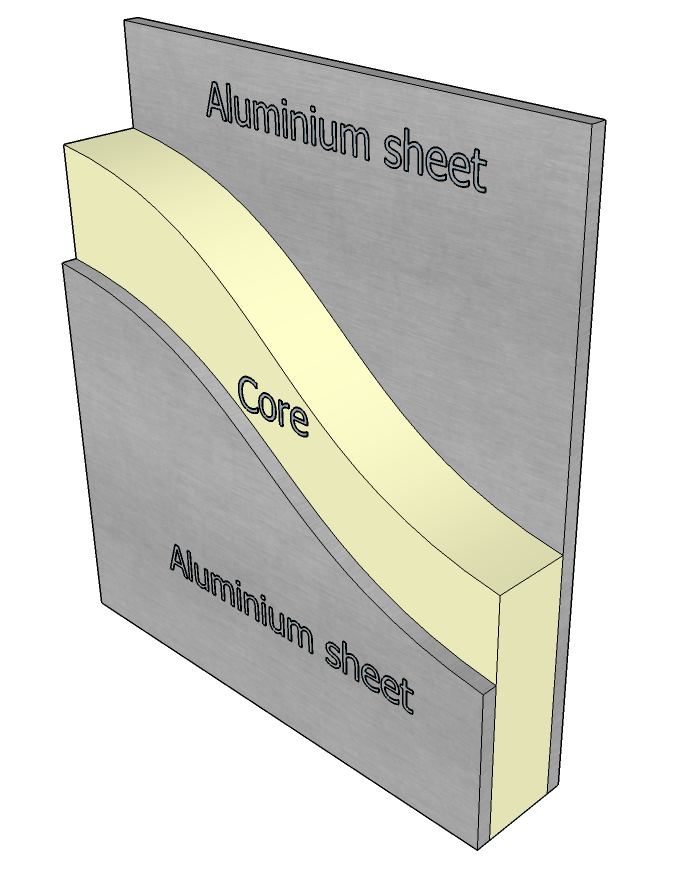
Structure of an ACM sandwich panel. In the case of Reynobond PE, the aluminium sheets' thickness is 0.5 mm (0.020 in) and overall panel thickness may be 3 mm (0.12 in), 4 mm (0.16 in), or 6 mm (0.24 in).

Fire safety experts have said that the building's new external cladding was a possible cause of the rapid spread of the fire. Experts said the gap between the cladding and the insulation worked like a chimney to spread the fire. The cladding could be seen burning and melting, causing additional speculation that it was not made of fire-resistant material. One resident said: "The whole one side of the building was on fire. The cladding went up like a matchstick."

Concerns about the dangers of external cladding were raised years before, following a fire in 1991 at flats in Knowsley Heights, Merseyside. Recent major high-rise fires that have involved flammable cladding are listed below.

Records show that a contractor had been paid £2.6 million to install an "ACM rainscreen over-clad" during the recent refurbishment at Grenfell Tower. ACM stands for "aluminium composite material", also known as a sandwich panel, the combustibility of which depends on the choice of insulation core material.

One of the products used was Arconic's Reynobond, which is available with different types of core material—polyethylene, as reportedly used in Grenfell Tower (Reynobond PE), or a more fire-resistant material (Reynobond FR). The Reynobond cladding reportedly cost £24 per square metre (£20 per sq. yd.) for the fire-retardant version, and £22 (£18) for the combustible version.

According to Arconic's website and brochure for the mainland European market at the time of the fire, the Reynobond PE cladding used was suitable only for buildings 10 m (33 ft) tall or less; the fire-retardant Reynobond FR was suitable for buildings up to 30 m (98 ft) tall; and above the latter height, such as the upper parts of Grenfell Tower, the non-combustible A2 version was supposed to be used ("As soon as the building is higher than the firefighters' ladders, it has to be conceived with an incombustible material"). After the fire, Arconic stopped sales of Reynobond PE worldwide for tower blocks.

Similar cladding containing highly flammable insulation material is believed to have been installed on thousands of other high-rise buildings in countries including Britain, France, the UAE and Australia. Advice published by the Centre for Window and Cladding Technology is that where such materials are used in buildings over 18m, the fire performance of the cladding system as a whole must be proven by testing.

In September 2014, a building regulations notice for the re-cladding work was submitted to the authority and marked with a status of "Completed—not approved". The use of a "Building Notice" building control application is used to remove the need to submit detailed plans and proposals to a building control inspector in advance, where the works performed will be approved by the inspector during the course of their construction. Building inspector Geoff Wilkinson remarked that this type of application is "wholly inappropriate for large complex buildings and should only be used on small, simple domestic buildings".

On 18 June, Chancellor of the Exchequer Philip Hammond stated that the cladding used on Grenfell Tower was banned in the United Kingdom. Grenfell Tower was inspected 16 times while the cladding was being put on but none of these inspections noticed that materials effectively banned in tall buildings were being used. Judith Blakeman, local Labour councillor questioned the competence of the inspectors. Blakeman, representing the Grenfell residents, said, "This raises the question of whether the building regulations officers were sufficiently competent and did they know what they were looking at. It also begs a question about what they were actually shown. Was anything concealed from them?"

The Department for Communities and Local Government stated that cladding with a polyethylene core "would be non-compliant with current Building Regulations guidance. This material should not be used as cladding on buildings over 18 metres (59 ft) in height." On 31 July 2017, the department released results of fire safety testing on the cladding panels used at Grenfell Tower, which were carried out by the Building Research Establishment and assigned the polyethylene filling a category three rating, designating a total lack of flame retardant properties.

Fire safety experts said the tests the government is doing on cladding only are insufficient, as the whole unit of cladding and insulation should be tested including fire stops. Fire safety experts maintain further that the testing lacks transparency, as the government has not described what tests are being carried out.

According to US-based Arconic, the polyethylene version of the material is banned in the United States for use in buildings exceeding 40 ft (12 m) in height, because of the risk of spreading fire and smoke. NPR subsequently stated that nearly all jurisdictions in the US (Note: with the exception of Indiana, Massachusetts, Minnesota and the District of Columbia.) have enacted the International Building Code (IBC) requirement that external wall assemblies (cladding, insulation, and wall) on high-rise buildings with combustible components must pass a rigorous real-world simulation test promulgated by the National Fire Protection Association under the name NFPA 285.

To perform the test, the entire planned assembly is constructed on a standardised test rig two storeys tall, with a window opening in the middle, and is continuously ignited with gas burners from two different angles for 30 minutes. The assembly must satisfy numerous performance criteria to pass, including a requirement that flames cannot spread more than 10 ft (3.0 m) vertically from the top of the window opening or 5 ft (1.5 m) horizontally.

A single NFPA 285 test can cost over US$30,000, and it certifies only a particular assembly (i.e., a particular combination of parts from specific manufacturers as they are currently fabricated), meaning that any change to any part used for any reason requires a new test. As of mid-2017 ACM cladding with a polyethylene core had not been able to pass the NFPA 285 test, and thus had been effectively banned on US high-rise buildings for decades. The UK does not mandate the use of such realistic simulations and allows its own similar full-scale tests to be bypassed as long as "the wall assembly components, when tested individually, pass small-scale combustibility tests."

==== Polyisocyanurate insulation ====
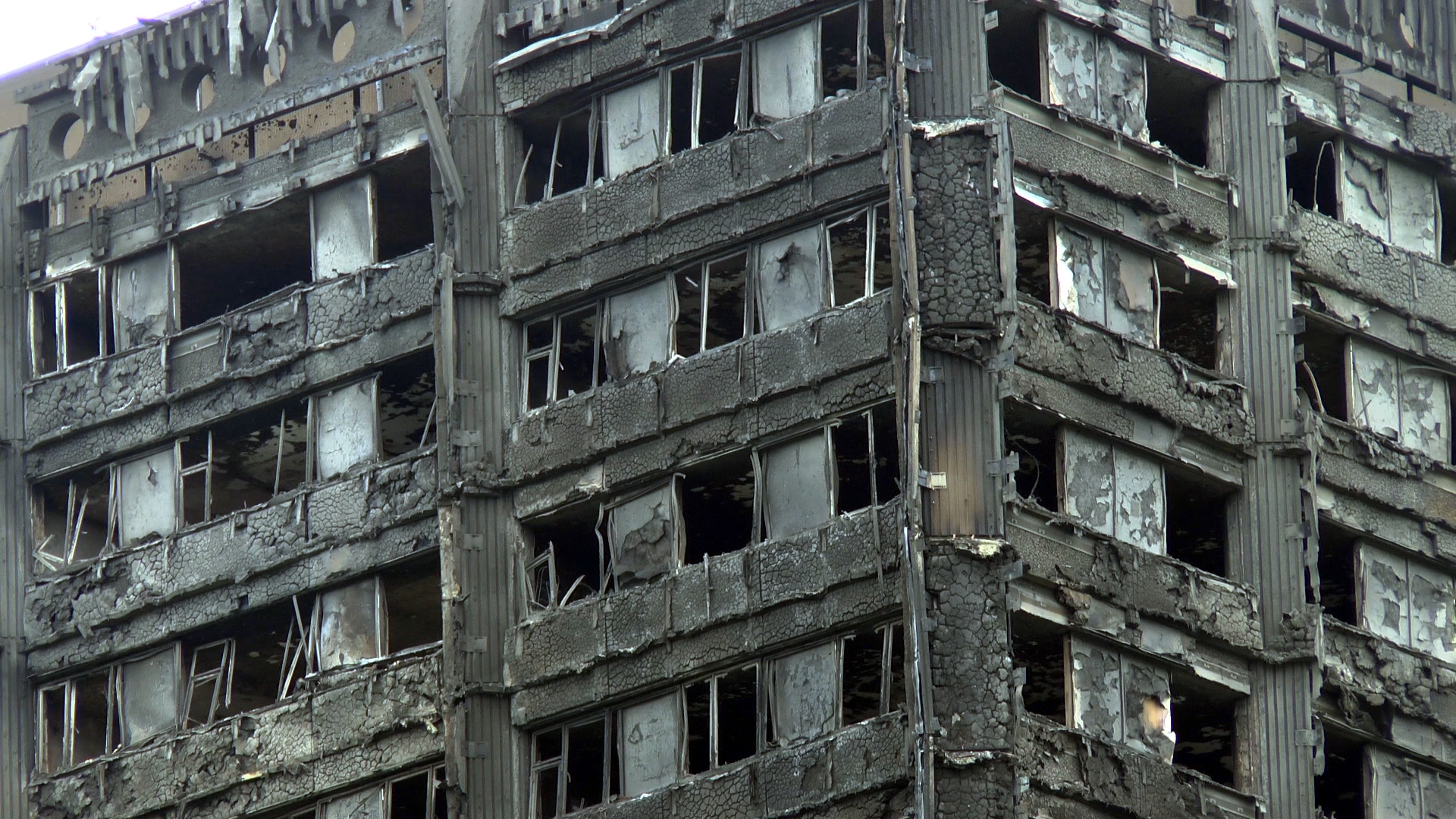
The top floors of Grenfell Tower after the fire, showing the burned insulation, with portions of the original structure revealed underneath. The cladding had melted.

The refurbishment also used an insulation foam product named Celotex RS5000, installed behind the cladding. Police said this insulation proved "more flammable than the cladding".

According to its datasheet, the polyisocyanurate (PIR) product—charred pieces of which littered the area around Grenfell Tower after the fire—"will burn if exposed to a fire of sufficient heat and intensity". PIR insulation foams "will, when ignited, burn rapidly and produce intense heat, dense smoke and gases which are irritating, flammable and/or toxic", among them carbon monoxide and hydrogen cyanide. The fire toxicity of polyisocyanurate foams has been well understood for some time.

At least three survivors were treated for cyanide poisoning. Simultaneous exposure to carbon monoxide and hydrogen cyanide is more lethal than exposure to the gases separately.

Celotex's Rainscreen Compliance Guide, when specifying Celotex RS5000 in buildings above 18 m (59 ft), sets out the conditions under which the product was tested and for which it has been certified as meeting the required fire safety standards. These include the use of (non-combustible) 12 mm (0.47 inches) fibre cement rainscreen panels, ventilated horizontal fire breaks at each floor slab edge and vertical non-ventilated fire breaks. It states that any changes from the tested configuration "will need to be considered by the building designer".

=== Cavity barriers ===
It has been asserted that cavity barriers intended to prevent the spread of fire in the gap between the façade and the building (the chimney effect) were of insufficient size and, in some cases, incorrectly installed, facilitating the spread of fire.

=== Windows ===
It has been asserted that windows and their surrounds installed as part of the refurbishment were less fire resistant than those they replaced due to the materials used and that the windows were of insufficient size necessitating larger surrounds. This would facilitate the spread of fire between the interior and exterior of the building.

== Criticism of the fire response ==
Criticism of the response to the fire primarily consisted of condemnation of issues with the emergency response and fire safety regulation practices in the UK at the time. Broader political criticism was also directed at British society, including condemnation of the response by governmental bodies and UK politicians, social divisions, deregulation issues, and poor transparency overall.

== Fire and structural safety reviews ==
=== United Kingdom ===
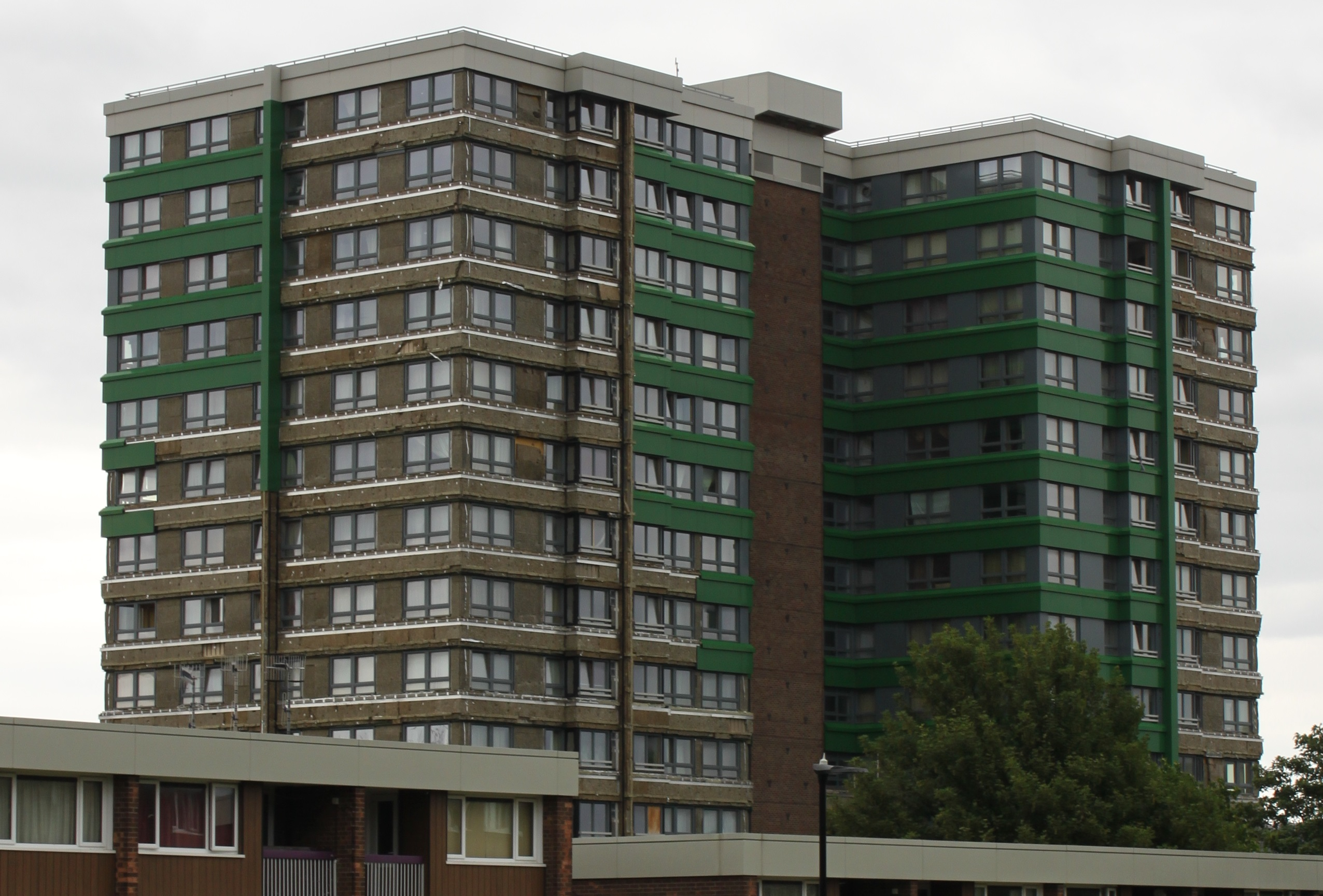
Hanover House, a residential tower block in Sheffield, with its cladding partially removed after failing fire safety tests following the Grenfell fire

In the days after the fire, UK local authorities undertook reviews of fire safety in their residential tower blocks. Building regulations also came under review in the light of the fire due to concerns with the rules and their enforcement. A parliamentary search briefing from August 2017 provided an overview of the legal framework under which fire risks in tower blocks were managed in England.

On 30 August 2017, the Department for Communities and Local Government (DCLG) published the terms of reference for the Independent Review of Building Regulations and Fire Safety. This independent review was led by Dame Judith Hackitt, who is a senior engineer and civil servant with experience as the Chair of the Health and Safety Executive. The review reported to both DCLG head, James Brokenshire (Sajid Javid at the time the report was commissioned) and Home Secretary, Sajid Javid (Amber Rudd at the time the report was commissioned). The two main aims of the review are firstly to develop improved building regulations for the future, with a focus on residential high-rise blocks, and secondly to provide reassurance to residents that their homes are safe.

The DCLG commissioned tests on how various cladding systems fared in a fire. Seven combinations were tested, and six deemed dangerous. It reported in August 2017 that there were 228 buildings in the United Kingdom cladded using these methods. There are no existing buildings in the UK using the one combination deemed safe, but it could be used to reclad all the buildings that are currently using the other combinations. These findings will be used to help revise the Building Regulations.

On 18 December 2017, Hackitt published her initial report. She described the entire building regulatory system as "not fit for purpose" and made interim recommendations for significant change. The final report was published on 17 May 2018, outlining a number of key failings and recommendations. The report did not recommend a ban on the use of combustible cladding on high rise buildings and Hackitt did say that she would support the government if it were to attempt to legislate a ban. Recommendations will be reconsidered after the conclusion of the public inquiry. The government is consulting on a possible ban on combustible materials. It is unclear if this applies only to cladding or to insulation as well.

In October 2018, the government announced plans to ban flammable cladding on newly built buildings that were over 18 m (59 ft), as well as for those of certain types such as schools, care homes and student housing. The Fire Brigades Union have argued that it should be entirely banned, and that a ban should also apply to existing buildings.

By November 2019, the Government had identified 446 residential and publicly owned buildings in England over 18 m in height with ACM cladding of the kind used on Grenfell Tower that were unlikely to meet Building Regulations and had pledged £600 million towards paying for remediation. However, as investigations arising from the Grenfell disaster proceeded, along with the Barking Riverside fire in June 2019 and the Bolton Cube fire in November 2019, it became clear that far more buildings in the UK either used materials that did not meet safety standards or were otherwise not constructed in accordance with building regulations. By June 2020, around 2,000 high-risk buildings had been identified over 18m tall in England alone; a further 9,600 high-rise buildings thought to have combustible cladding; and 100,000 between 11 and 18 metres whose status was as yet unknown. In 2019, there was a collapse in confidence in the safety of blocks of flats among mortgage lenders and insurers, leading to the freezing of a substantial section of the UK housing market. By February 2021, the government had pledged somewhat over £5 billion towards the remediation of fire safety problems—a figure that still fell far short of the costs involved, many of which were being borne by owners of flats who had bought them in the belief that they had been built legally.

On 22 June 2020, another London tower block, "Ferrier Point" in Canning Town, Newham was evacuated after a flat fire that occurred on the fourth floor of the tower at around 18:20. Around 60 firefighters attended to fight the fire, which was under control by 20:15. The tower block had contained the exact same aluminium composite cladding as the one at Grenfell, but this was removed a year before the fire occurred. Residents were noted as saying that the just-in-time removal of the cladding prevented another tragedy on the scale of Grenfell.

=== International ===
In Australia, authorities decided to remove similar cladding from all its tower blocks. It was stated that every tower block built in Melbourne in the previous 20 years had the cladding. In Malta, the Chamber of Engineers and the Chamber of Architects urged the Maltese Government to update the building regulations with regards to fire safety. On 27 June 2017, an 11-storey tower block in Wuppertal, North Rhine-Westphalia, Germany was evacuated after it was found that the cladding was similar to that installed on Grenfell Tower.

A month after the fire at Grenfell Tower the external cladding of the newly built 433-room Hilton Hotel at Schiphol airport in the Netherlands was partly removed, over concerns of fire safety. Allegedly due to financial problems at the supplier, the material used did not meet the approved standards. Additional to the replacement, an external video system was installed specifically to detect fires. A university building in Rotterdam was also found to have the same cladding and was subsequently closed and refurbished. "Dozens" of other buildings in the Netherlands allegedly suffered the same defects.

Days after the fire, the Gibraltar Government ordered a review of the cladding found in all the tower blocks in the British overseas territory. It was later determined that the cladding used was non-flammable and therefore not of the same type as at Grenfell.

In response to Grenfell Tower and similar high-rise fires in the Middle East involving exterior cladding, the United Arab Emirates updated its Fire and Life Safety Code in 2018 to mandate the use of the NFPA 285 fire safety test.

== Investigations ==
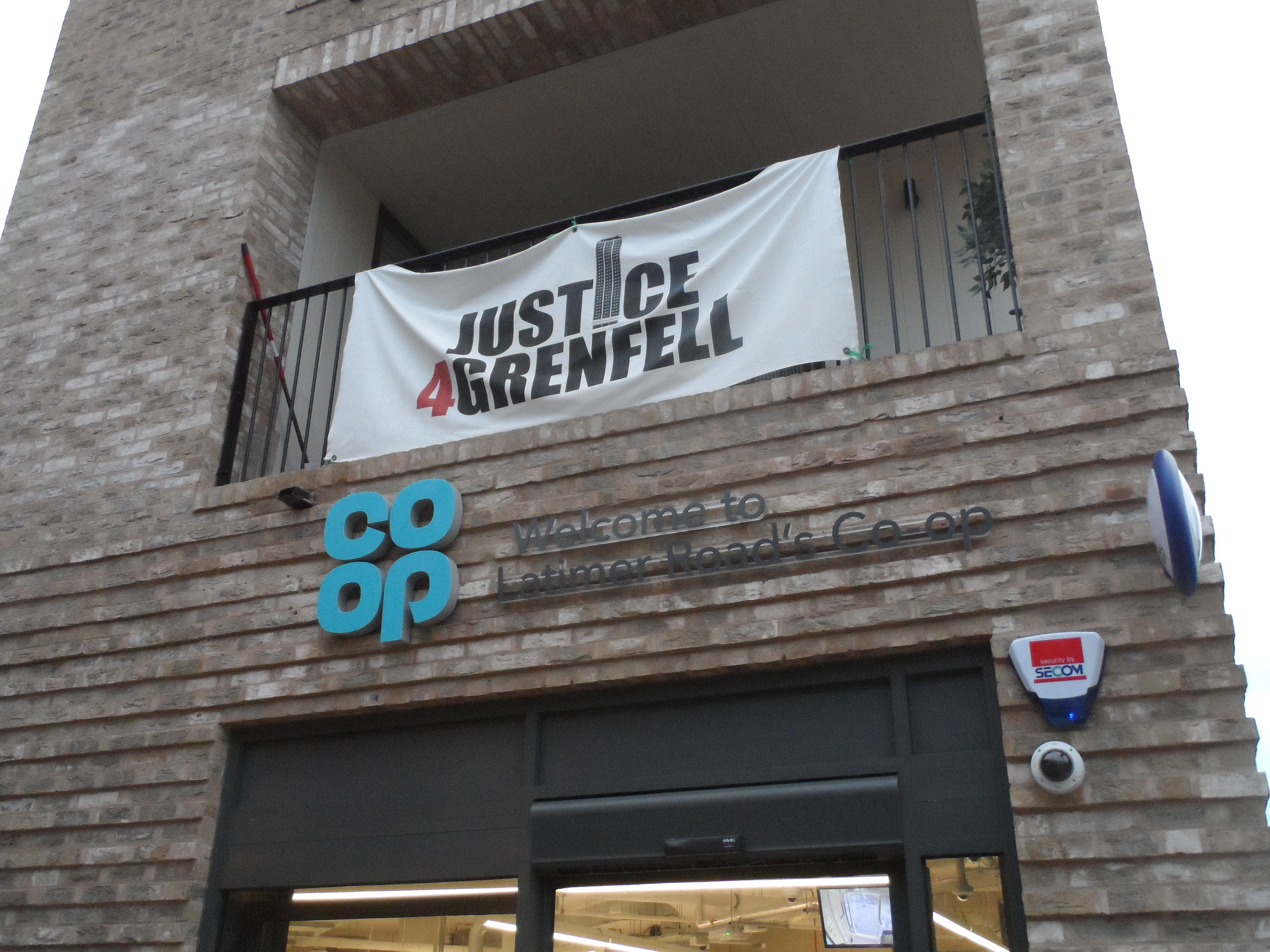
Campaign banner for local community group 'Justice4Grenfell'

The local borough pledged to carry out a full investigation into the fire. Prime Minister Theresa May ordered a full public inquiry, saying that people "deserve answers" to why the fire was able to spread as quickly as it did.

In July 2017, the government offered an amnesty to those who had been illegally sub-letting and a one-year immigration amnesty to those who came forward with information, though did not offer a full guarantee against deportation. On 31 August 2017 Immigration Minister Brandon Lewis announced that the deadline to register for the one-year immigration amnesty for displaced undocumented residents of Grenfell Tower was to be extended by three months to 30 November 2017. Sir Martin Moore-Bick (who led the public inquiry) wrote to the Prime Minister asking her to consider the long-term future for these residents beyond their value as witnesses for the inquiry. These views were echoed by campaign groups BMELawyers4Grenfell and Justice4Grenfell.

On 16 September 2019 it was reported that London Fire Brigade as a body have been interviewed by Metropolitan Police under caution in respect of the Health and Safety at Work etc. Act 1974. In a press statement, LFB Commissioner Dany Cotton said the brigade had been subject to police investigation from just after the fire; hundreds of officers had given voluntary police interviews; and LFB would continue to assist investigators.

Leilani Farha argued that the failings of Grenfell Tower were a breach of residents' human rights, because they were not sufficiently involved in the way the building was developed, notably safety issues, before the fire and are not sufficiently involved in the investigations after the fire.

=== Criminal ===
On 15 June 2017, Metropolitan Police Commander Stuart Cundy announced that a criminal investigation had been opened to establish if there was any case for charges to be brought. On 27 July 2017, police issued a public notice to residents saying that they had "reasonable grounds" to suspect that both the Royal Borough of Kensington and Chelsea and the Kensington and Chelsea Tenant Management Organisation "may have committed" corporate manslaughter. Senior representatives of both organisations are likely to face police interviews under caution. More than sixty companies and organisations are associated with Grenfell Tower, and as of July 2017, police were keeping open all options for a range of possible charges. These include manslaughter, corporate manslaughter, misconduct in public office and fire safety offences.

In an interview with the London Evening Standard on 7 August 2017, the Director of Public Prosecutions, Alison Saunders, said investigations are at an early stage and nothing is ruled out. Mrs Saunders said it was more important to build strong cases than to rush to court, and that the DPP had yet to see the evidence. Health and safety legislation and other criminal laws will be considered. If proven, the offence of gross negligence manslaughter carries a maximum life sentence, with a guideline minimum of twelve years. For such a charge the prosecution must show sufficient evidence to pass a four-stage "Adomako Test" proving a reprehensible breach of duty of care, which caused or contributed to the victims' death.

On 7 June 2018, BBC News reported that the Met Police are investigating the London Fire Brigade for using the "Stay Put" policy. Possible criminal offences under the Health and Safety at Work Act are under consideration.

As of 7 June 2019, thirteen interviews had been held under caution with more expected, and 7,100 statements had been taken from witnesses, family members, emergency service personnel and others. In March 2019, the Met Police said that no criminal charges were likely before late 2021.

Police investigations are independent from the Inquiry and cannot use it directly as evidence, although it will be studied carefully. Following publication on 4 September 2024, Met Police said it would take "at least 12–18 months" before cases could be presented. The CPS stated they did not expect any charging decisions before the end of 2026.

In May 2026, the Met Police said they had untangled a “web of blame” with 20 organisations and 57 individuals identified as suspects for corporate manslaughter, gross negligence manslaughter, health and safety offences, fraud and fraud-related offences, and misconduct in public office. In September 2026 police passed files on all 20 organisations and 54 of the individuals to the Crown Prosecution Service (CPS) for possible prosecution. These include possible charges against the Royal Borough of Kensington and Chelsea, and possible Crown censure instead of prosecution, for the Ministry of Housing, Communities and Local Government, which as a government department cannot be prosecuted. The CPS said charging decisions would be made before the tenth anniversary of the Grenfell fire, but court cases were unlikely to begin much before 2029. The police explained the delay as due to Grenfell being "one of the most complex investigations ever undertaken by any UK law enforcement agency", on a "truly enormous" scale.

"One of the reasons the investigation had taken so long was due to the need to investigate conflicting claims over responsibility made during the phase two inquiry. [...] In terms of the carousel of blame, or the web of blame, as the inquiry referred to it, it has been a challenge for the investigation. It’s one of the reasons that it’s taken us such a period of time to be able to decipher that and untangle effectively."
- Police statement by Gary Moncrieff, officer in overall command of the investigation, 19 May 2026.

==== Fraudulent claims ====
On 19 September 2017, Commander Stuart Cundy briefed that eight people were being investigated for allegedly making false claims to financial support in the name of fictitious victims. By 1 June 2018, five people had been convicted for fraud offences after stating they were victims of the fire to claim financial support.

New arrests were made in London on 7 June 2018 of a further nine people suspected of fraud. Four were charged a day later. Three people were charged with fraud while one additional suspect was initially charged with drug and theft offences but was eventually charged with fraud on 19 July. The other five were released under investigation.

By March 2020, twenty one people had been charged with fraud offences relating to the fire, with all of them being found guilty after twenty investigations by the Metropolitan Police and one investigation by the City of London Police Insurance Fraud Enforcement Department. They were given prison sentences totalling almost 90 years in total after fraudulently claiming around £1 million in pre-paid credit cards, hotel accommodation costs and other funds intended for the victims of the fire.

All of those convicted of fraud stated that they lived in the tower block and that their homes had been destroyed, and many said that members of their family had been killed. They spent their money on lavish holidays, expensive cars and gambling, and some even asked for more money after complaining about the food and WiFi in the hotels they were being housed in. Three of those convicted were also found to have been illegal immigrants living in the UK, and one man was caught with quantities of illegal drugs in his hotel room. Another man was also found to have committed a burglary. A woman who pretended to be a Grenfell victim was found to have made more than fifty false claims to insurers and to have also said she was present at the Manchester Arena bombing and the London Bridge attack just weeks earlier.

=== Forensic search and recovery ===
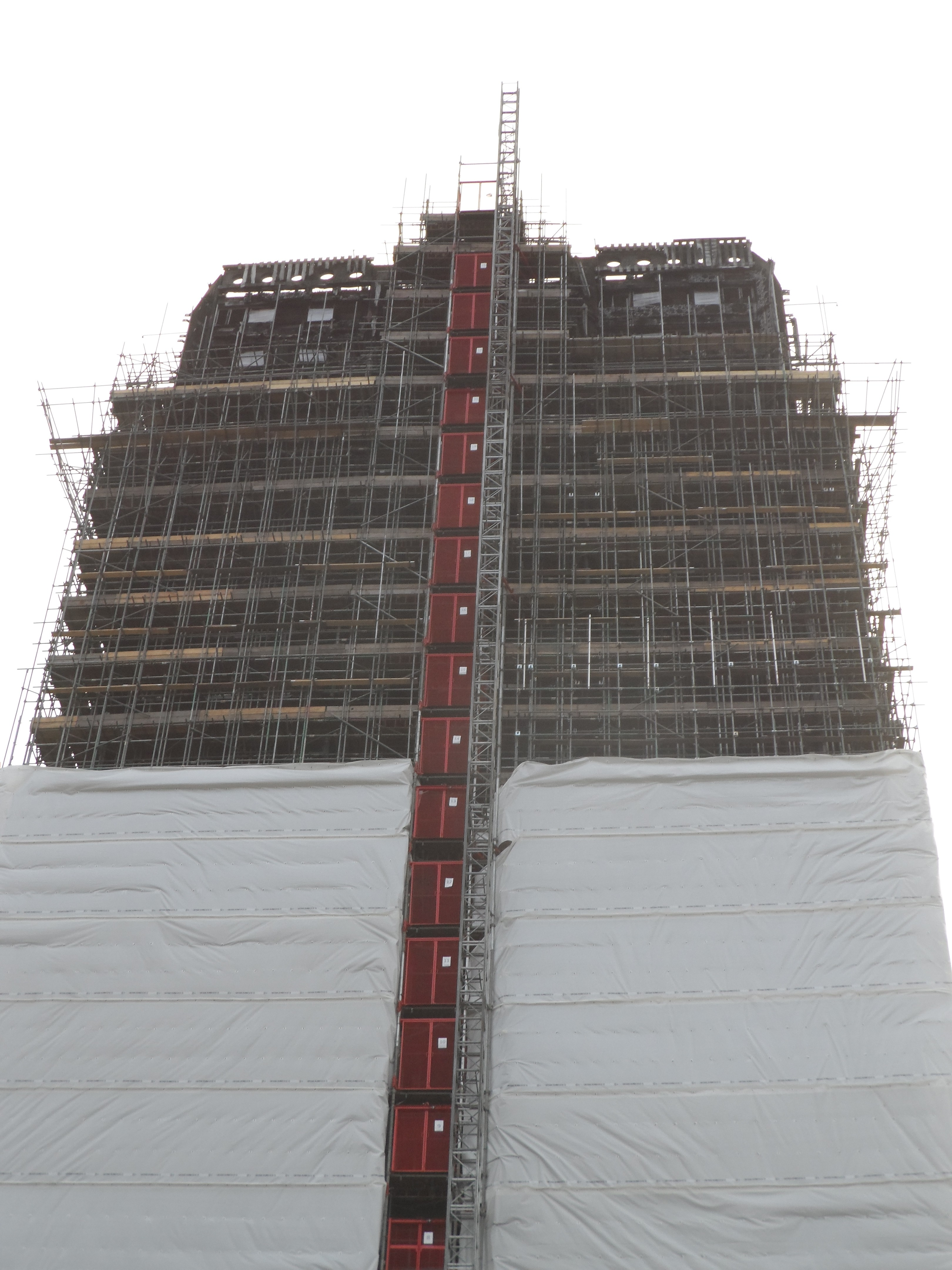
View of the lift and hoist system installed on the east face of the tower to remove debris from the tower

Detailed investigations into the causes and possible criminal charges of manslaughter or breach of regulations are in progress. Search dogs, fingertip searches, DNA matching, fingerprinting, forensic dentistry and forensic anthropologists have been used. An external lift was fitted to the building to improve access.

The scale of the search and recovery operation was challenging. Human remains were mixed within an estimated 15.5 tonnes (17.1 tons) of debris on every floor. Time and care was taken during Disaster Victim Identification to maintain a judicial standard and avoid mistaken identity, which could have caused further distress to surviving relatives.

=== Fire brigade ===
Following the Newsnight report of 7 July 2017, the LFB said issues encountered in its response to the fire would also form part of the police investigation. LFB Commissioner Dany Cotton said in a Channel 4 News interview on 11 July 2017 that she expected reasonable criticism of the LFB response in the investigation and public inquiry. Following criticism by survivors and victims families, Cotton retired early at the end of December 2019. Her replacement from 1 January 2020 is Deputy Commissioner Andrew Roe.

BBC Radio 4 reported on 16 August 2017 that the Fire Brigade was advised by KCTMO during the refurbishment and fire officers had been shown "fire safety features". Council opposition leader Robert Atkinson, structural engineer Paul Follows and building inspector Geoff Wilkinson all expressed shock that the fire had happened given prior consultation with LFB.

London Fire Brigade said it had not given approval for the work, saying its legal powers are limited. It said firefighters regularly visit buildings to gain familiarity with the layout and equipment, but that this was not the same as a detailed inspection.

=== Public inquiry ===
One day after the fire broke out, Prime Minister Theresa May announced a public inquiry into the causes of the fire. Two weeks later, Sir Martin Moore-Bick was appointed to lead it. He pledged that the inquiry would be "open, transparent and fair". The inquiry will run alongside the criminal investigations.

On 15 August 2017, Theresa May announced the terms of reference, accepting in full Moore-Bick's proposals. The inquiry plans to examine the cause and spread of the fire, the adequacy and enforcement of building regulations and fire protection measures, the actions of the council and KCTMO prior to the fire, and the responses of the London Fire Brigade, council and national government. Labour Party politicians and some survivors called for the inquiry to include a broader examination of national social housing policy, which was not included in the terms of reference. The inquiry's public hearings started on 14 September 2017.

The first report (Phase 1) from the inquiry was officially published on 30 October 2019, but had been leaked and publicised during the press embargo. Originally due in spring 2019, the date was pushed back to October. Moore-Bick told survivors the timing disappointed him.

Moore-Bick's report affirmed the exterior cladding was the primary reason the fire spread out of control, and that it did not comply with the building regulations. He praised the "courage and devotion to duty" of the firefighters but argued LFB suffered from "significant systemic failings" and that incident commanders were not trained to deal with a failure of compartmentation of this scale. The report was welcomed by survivors. On 6 December, Dany Cotton announced she would retire earlier than planned.

The inquiry resumed with Phase 2 on 28 January 2020. The final report was published on 4 September 2024. The inquiry formally closed on 10 February 2025. The Government published its response and recommendations on 26 February 2025.

=== Equality and Human Rights Commission report ===
The Following Grenfell report (March 2019) observes that children who witnessed the fire, or who have lost a friend or part of their family, did not know where or how to access help because the services are not available.

The EHRC report expressed particular concern around the placing of disabled people, including wheelchair users, on upper storeys of tower blocks without any consideration about how they could escape in a fire or other emergency. The report considered disabled people had faced discriminatory treatment amounting to breaches of the right to life, the right to safe, adequate housing; and the right to freedom from cruel, inhuman and degrading treatment, further noting that degrading treatment continued after the fire with disabled people being housed in inaccessible premises.

=== Civil lawsuit ===
On 11 June 2019, survivors and families of the victims of the fire filed a civil action complaint in the Court of Common Pleas of the First Judicial District of Pennsylvania in Philadelphia against Arconic and Celotex (both of which are headquartered in Pennsylvania), seeking an unspecified amount of money damages for various product liability claims. The 420-page complaint alleged that the cladding and insulation were defective because they lacked fire retardant and were therefore combustible. Whirlpool, the Michigan-based manufacturer of the Hotpoint refrigerator believed to have caused the fire, was also named as a defendant in the suit on the grounds that the refrigerator contained materials liable to catch fire.

By August, the defendants had exercised their right to remove the case to the appropriate federal court: the United States District Court for the Eastern District of Pennsylvania. In November 2019, Arconic resisted production of documents (which were already in the possession of its American lawyers at DLA Piper) on the basis that the cladding at issue had been manufactured by a French subsidiary, Arconic Architectural Products SAS, and that French law prohibits the production of commercial information in foreign legal proceedings without authorisation by a French court. Arconic retained French lawyer Noëlle Lenoir as its expert witness on this issue, and she reviewed 43,303 documents to identify which ones could be disclosed to the plaintiffs. According to its US corporate filings, as of November 2019, Arconic had already spent approximately £30 million on lawyers and advisers to respond to all the criminal and civil investigations, inquiries, and litigation arising out of the fire.

On 16 September 2020, the district court filed a lengthy order granting the defendants' motion to dismiss on the grounds of forum non conveniens (meaning the dismissal was without prejudice to filing claims in English courts). The order, signed by Judge Michael Baylson, acknowledged that the parties' submissions showed that the potential compensatory and punitive damages for the plaintiffs' claims would be higher under Pennsylvania law than English law, but ruled that many other factors weighed in favour of dismissal. The order allowed the plaintiffs to use evidence already obtained through US discovery in support of their claims in English courts, and left open the possibility that they could come back if the English courts were to decide that Pennsylvania law applies to their claims and one or more defendants may be liable for punitive damages under Pennsylvania law. On 8 July 2022, the Third Circuit filed an unpublished opinion signed by Judge Thomas L. Ambro, which largely affirmed the district court's dismissal order. However, the Third Circuit also expressly reversed the part of the district court's order, which had left open a path for the plaintiffs to come back from English courts. On 21 February 2023, the US Supreme Court filed a terse one-line order summarily denying the plaintiffs' petition for certiorari, which meant their case was over (as far as the US courts were concerned).

In October 2026, a group of institutional investors filed a lawsuit against Kingspan Group under the Financial Services and Markets Act 2000, seeking over €100 million in damages over alleged misrepresentations concerning the fire safety of its insulation products.

=== Civil settlement ===
In April 2023, a group of 22 parties including cladding company Arconic, Whirlpool, RBKC, KCTMO, and three central government departments, reached a settlement with 900 people, for about £150 million. Represented by a group of fourteen law firms, claims were initially brought in the English High Court and were then later moved to alternative dispute resolution (specifically, mediation before Lord Neuberger). Contributions are also to be made to a restorative justice community project. This outcome does not affect the possibility of future criminal charges, which are to be decided by the CPS following publication of the inquiry report, which was released on 4 September 2024.

=== Professional misconduct ===
On 26 February 2025 it was announced that seven organisations are to be investigated under the Procurement Act 2023. These are:

- Arconic Architectural Products SAS
- Saint-Gobain Construction Products UK Limited
- Exova (UK) Limited
- Harley Facades Limited
- Kingspan Insulation Limited
- Rydon Maintenance Limited
- Studio E Architects Limited

Angela Rayner, serving at the time as Housing Secretary, remarked that regulators had failed and that her department had "failed to act on known risks and ignored, delayed, or disregarded matters affecting the safety of life".

== Demolition and memorial ==
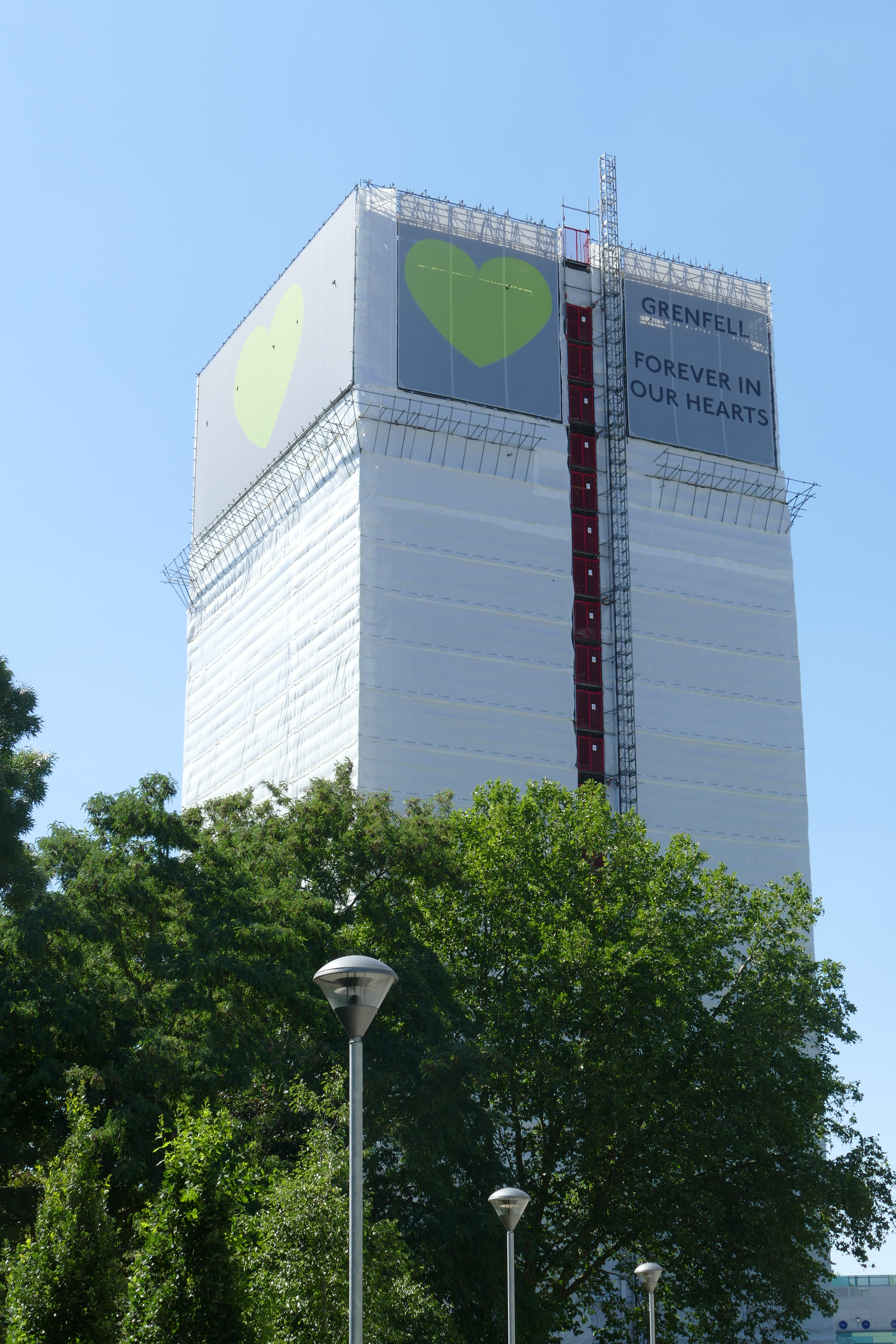
Grenfell Tower covered in scaffolding and protective wrap in May 2018

Grenfell Tower site manager Michael Lockwood announced in July 2017 that the building would be covered in a protective wrap supported by scaffolding, which would protect forensic evidence and later allow the building to be taken down. The community was to be consulted on how the space should be used after demolition.

Structural engineers advised that the tower posed a risk; the government has said the tower should be "carefully taken down". Plans for the site were expected to be published by the Grenfell Tower Memorial Commission, established in 2018. Lockwood and Thelma Stober were elected as co-chairs in 2020.

In July 2024, the Royal Institute of British Architects started selecting design teams to create a memorial. In January 2025, RIBA and the independent Grenfell Tower Memorial Commission announced the names of five teams shortlisted to design the future memorial on the tower's site.

In February 2025, Angela Rayner, then deputy prime minister, told bereaved relatives and survivors that a decision had been made to demolish Grenfell Tower, with dismantling of the tower expected to take two years. In April 2025, the contract to demolish the tower was awarded to Deconstruct UK, the company currently maintaining the site, due to its knowledge of the building's structure and surrounding area. Each floor is expected to take one month to demolish, with the tower having 24 floors in total. Demolition began in September 2025.

Grenfell Tower Memorial (Expenditure) Act 2026 (Note: Section 2.)
- Act of Parliament
- Parliament of the United Kingdom
- Long title: An Act to authorise the payment out of money provided by Parliament of expenditure incurred by the Secretary of State in connection with the commemoration of the victims of the fire at Grenfell Tower; and for connected purposes.
- Citation: 2026 c. 16
- Introduced by: Steve Reed Secretary of State for Housing, Communities and Local Government] (Commons); Baroness Taylor of Stevenage (Lords)
- Territorial extent: United Kingdom

Dates
- Royal assent: 29 April 2026
- Commencement: 29 April 2026 (Note: The Acts of Parliament (Commencement) Act 1793.)

Status: Current legislation

History of passage through Parliament

Text of statute as originally enacted

Revised text of statute as amended

The Grenfell Tower Memorial (Expenditure) Act 2026 was passed to enable long-term government spending on a memorial.

== See also ==
- Building regulations in the United Kingdom § Part B. Fire safety
- Fire services in the United Kingdom
- History of fire safety legislation in the United Kingdom
- Khadija Saye, a victim of the fire
- List of fires in high-rise buildings
- List of high-rise façade fires
- King's Cross fire – 1987 London fire
