= Anna Stec =

Professor in Fire Chemistry and Toxicology

Anna Agnieszka Stec FHEA is Professor in Fire Chemistry and Toxicology at the University of Central Lancashire. Her interests include the assessment of toxic and irritant hazards in fires, and the factors affecting fire gas toxicity.

== Education ==
Stec gained a MSC (Eng) from Warsaw University of Technology, and a PhD (Fire Chemistry and Toxicity) from University of Bolton. Her thesis title was "Fire toxicity and its measurement".

== Professional bodies ==
- Fellow of the Institution of Fire Engineers (FIFireE)
- Fellow of the Royal Society of Chemistry (FRSC)
- Fellow of the Higher Education Academy (FHEA)
- Chartered Scientist (CSci) of the Science Council
- Member of International Association for Fire Safety Science

== Research ==
In 2012 she led research, presented to an American Chemical Society symposium on "Fire and polymers", which showed that halogen-based flame retardants used in many domestic and other consumer products can increase the production of carbon monoxide and hydrogen cyanide gases which are the main cause of deaths from fire. "We found that flame retardants have the undesirable effect of increasing the amounts of carbon monoxide and hydrogen cyanide released during combustion," she said.

In 2013 she experimented with the effects of fire on a 1950 style British house discovering that toxic gases were as prevalent in closed rooms and ones with their doors open: this affected emergency egress times. Her work in 2018 showed that fire fighters were 3 times more likely to contract cancer, as the carcinogens entered through the skin. The methods used to wash their protective gear washed the carcinogens into the fibres making them carcinogenic.

== Grenfell Tower Inquiry ==
Seventy-one people died in the Grenfell Tower fire. Stec had warned of the toxic nature of plastic cladding in an academic paper.

On 8 February 2018, Stec briefed Public Health England, saying further analysis was needed of soil and dust within the tower and other evacuated buildings before residents returned. The so-called “Grenfell cough” reported by survivors is indicative of elevated levels of atmospheric contaminants such as polycyclic aromatic hydrocarbons (PAH) which are potentially carcinogenic.

Early results indicate high levels of PAH in the surrounding soil and the biggest threat to survivors would be from absorption of toxic material via the skin, not from smoke inhalation. Black soot from the fire was highly likely to be contaminated with asbestos from the tower. There would be potential large-scale contamination up to a mile around the tower, with potential long-term health implications.

In September 2018 Stec was appointed as an expert witness to the Grenfell Tower Enquiry.
