= Chemosphere (journal) =

- Discipline: Environmental chemistry
- Language: English
- Edited by: Jacob de Boer, Willie Peijnenburg, Yeomin Yoon

Publication details
- History: 1972–present
- Publisher: Elsevier
- Frequency: Biweekly
- Impact factor: Removed (2024)

Standard abbreviations
- ISO 4: Chemosphere

Indexing
- CODEN: CMSHAF
- ISSN: 0045-6535 (print); 1879-1298 (web)
- LCCN: 72622992
- OCLC no.: 795935924

Links
- Journal homepage; Online access; Online archive

Chemosphere is a biweekly peer-reviewed scientific journal published since 1972 by Elsevier and covering environmental chemistry.

In July 2023, the journal was put on hold in the Web of Science Master Journal List due to quality concerns. By May 2024, the journal had marked more than 60 papers with expressions of concern, typically citing "unusual changes" of authorship prior to publication and "potential undisclosed conflicts of interest" by reviewers and handling editors. In December 16, 2024, Web of Science delisted the journal.

This followed an incident in which the journal published a paper claiming that household products made of black plastic contained dangerous amount of toxic chemicals, leading to the media warning readers to throw away black plastic products. However, the study was found to have a math error in calculating the reference dose for a 60 kg adult, which made the abundance of BDE-209, a toxic flame retardant found in the plastic appear to exceed U.S. limits (the estimated daily dose of the flame retardant was not questioned or corrected). The authors later published a correction note, while claiming the error "does not affect the overall conclusion of the paper."

== Editors-in-chief ==
The following persons are or have been editor-in-chief:

- 2020–2024: Jacob de Boer (Vrije Universiteit Amsterdam) and Shane Snyder (University of Arizona)
- 2024–present: Jacob de Boer, Willie Peijnenburg (Leiden University), and Yeomin Yoon (Ewha Womans University)

== Abstracting and indexing ==
The journal is abstracted and indexed in:

- Biological Abstracts
- BIOSIS Previews
- CAB Abstracts
- Chemical Abstracts Service
- Current Contents/Agriculture, Biology & Environmental Sciences
- EBSCO databases
- Ei Compendex
- Food Science and Technology Abstracts
- GEOBASE
- Index Medicus/MEDLINE/PubMed
- Science Citation Index Expanded
- Scopus
- The Zoological Record

According to the Journal Citation Reports, the journal has a 2023 impact factor of 8.1.
