= Garnock Court fire =

1999 fire in Irvine, Scotland

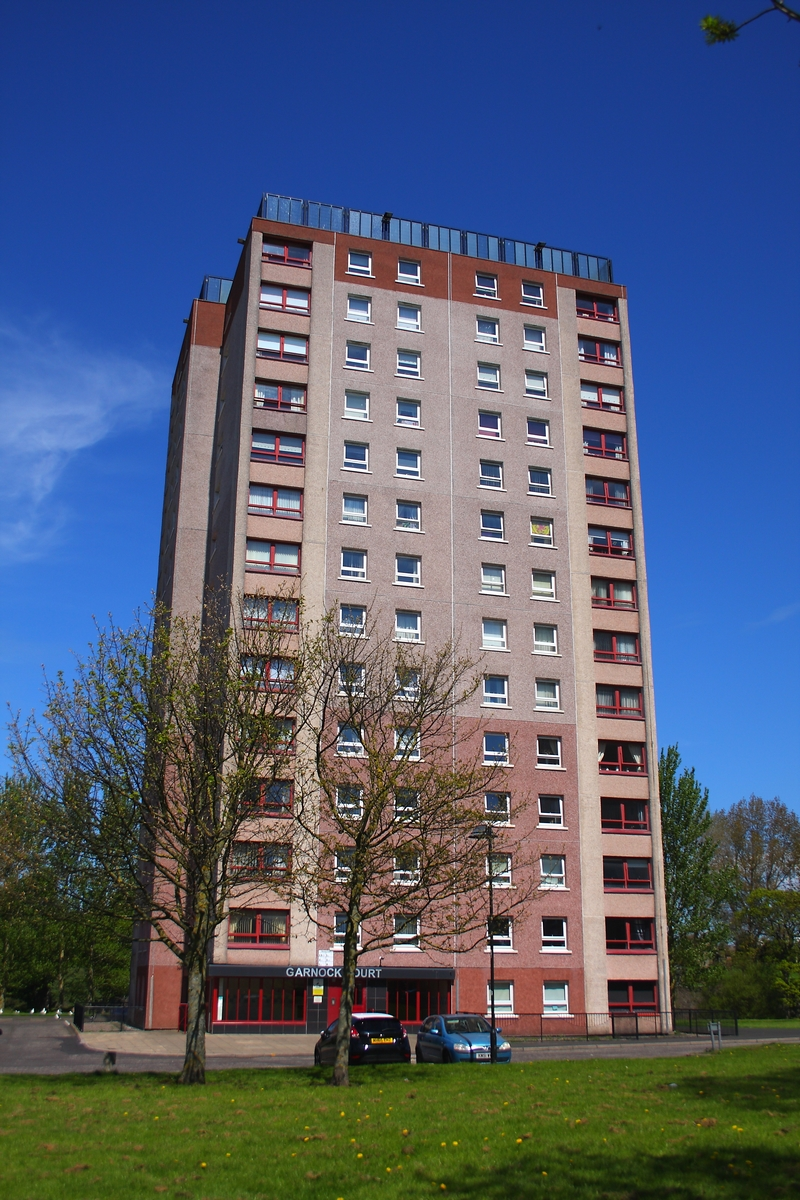
- Garnock Court tower in 2018
- Date: 11 June 1999
- Location: Garnock Court, Irvine, Scotland; 55.6112°N 4.6671°W
- Cause: Cigarette fire
- Outcome: Building (Scotland) Regulations 2004 (came into force on 1 May 2005)
- Deaths: 1
- Injuries: 4

The Garnock Court fire was a fire that took place on 11 June 1999 at Garnock Court, a 14-storey block of flats in Irvine, Scotland, which resulted in one fatality. The fire spread via the external cladding, reaching the 12th floor within ten minutes of the start of the fire, destroying flats on nine floors.

A disabled pensioner, William Linton, believed to be in his 80s, dropped his lit cigarette which caused the blaze. He was later found dead. Four people were taken to University Hospital Crosshouse, Kilmarnock, suffering from the effects of smoke inhalation.

The block was owned by North Ayrshire Council, who ordered the precautionary removal of plastic cladding and PVC window frames. There was a Scottish select committee review that reported in January 2000, and this led to the Building (Scotland) Act 2003, which introduced the Building (Scotland) Regulations 2004 which came into force on 1 May 2005.

This act includes this mandatory regulation:

Every building must be designed and constructed in such a way that in the event of an outbreak of fire within the building, or from an external source, the spread of fire on the external walls of the building is inhibited.

Garnock Court tower was demolished in 2023.
