= Lakanal House fire =

2009 fire in a London tower block

Lakanal House

General information
- Status: Damaged
- Type: Apartment
- Location: Camberwell, London
- Coordinates: TQ 334 768; 51°28′29.57″N 0°04′47.54″W
- Construction started: 1950s
- Completed: 1960
- Opening: 1960

Technical details
- Floor count: 14

Design and construction
- Architect: F.O. Hayes (Camberwell Borough Council Architect)
- Developer: Camberwell Borough Council
- Structural engineer: W.V. Zinn
- Main contractor: John Laing & Sons Ltd.

The Lakanal House fire occurred in a tower block on 3 July 2009 in Camberwell, London. Six people were killed, and at least 20 injured, when a high-rise fire, caused by a faulty television set, developed and spread through a number of flats in the twelve-storey building.

== Background ==
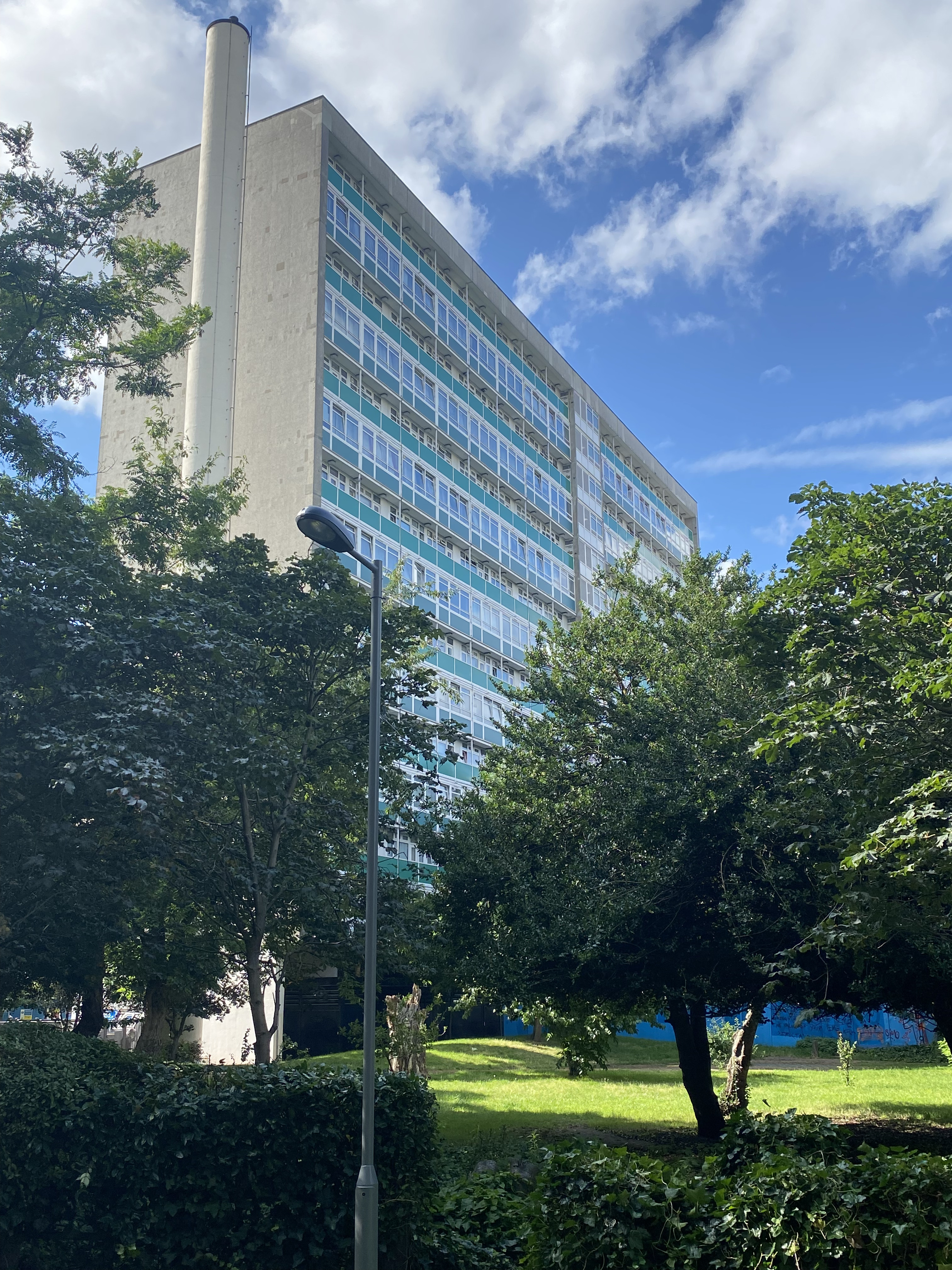
Lakanal House in August 2021

Lakanal House (named after the French politician and educational pioneer Joseph Lakanal) is a 14-storey tower block that forms part of the Sceaux Gardens Estate, Camberwell. It contains 98 flats, and is 137 feet 6 inches (41.91 m) high. The building dates from 1959. It is made up of two-bedroom maisonettes of a two-storey interlocking design. The flats are entered from the right or left side of a central access corridor. On the access level, there are two bedrooms and a bathroom. There are stairs to the upper level where a lounge and kitchen stretch across the full width of the block. This means that the lounge for each flat is above one of the bedrooms of that flat and one of the bedrooms of the flat on the opposite side of the access corridor. The flats were built with fire exits from the lounge and the kitchen to 'exit balconies' on either side of the building, and also a fire exit from the largest bedroom into the central access corridor, separate from the front door.

Southwark Council stated following the fire that it had recently spent £3.5 million on refurbishment to meet current fire safety standards.

== Fire ==
At 16:20 BST (15:20 UTC) on 3 July 2009, a fire broke out in one of the flats of Lakanal House. London Fire Brigade responded with a total of eighteen fire engines attending the incident. The source of the fire was a faulty television in a flat on the ninth floor.

The central stairwell, the only way in and out of the building, was filled quickly with thick dark smoke, and an operational command centre was erected on the seventh floor. First responders repeatedly urged 999 callers to remain in their flats instead of attempting to flee, based on the theory of compartmentation, in which the flats would help protect the families while the blaze was contained.

London Fire Brigade rescued a number of people from the flats. The injured were taken to Guy's Hospital, King's College Hospital and Lewisham.

=== Victims ===
One person admitted to Guy's Hospital and two people admitted to King's College Hospital later died, in addition to three people who died in the fire. Nine other people were treated at an emergency centre set up by Southwark Council. One of the firemen was also admitted to hospital after being injured while fighting the fire.

The dead were three adults and three young children, aged 20 days to 34 years. One of the adults, a 31-year-old fashion designer, spent 40 minutes on the phone with 999 responders who urged her to stay in her flat; at the end of the call the responder could no longer hear her breathing.

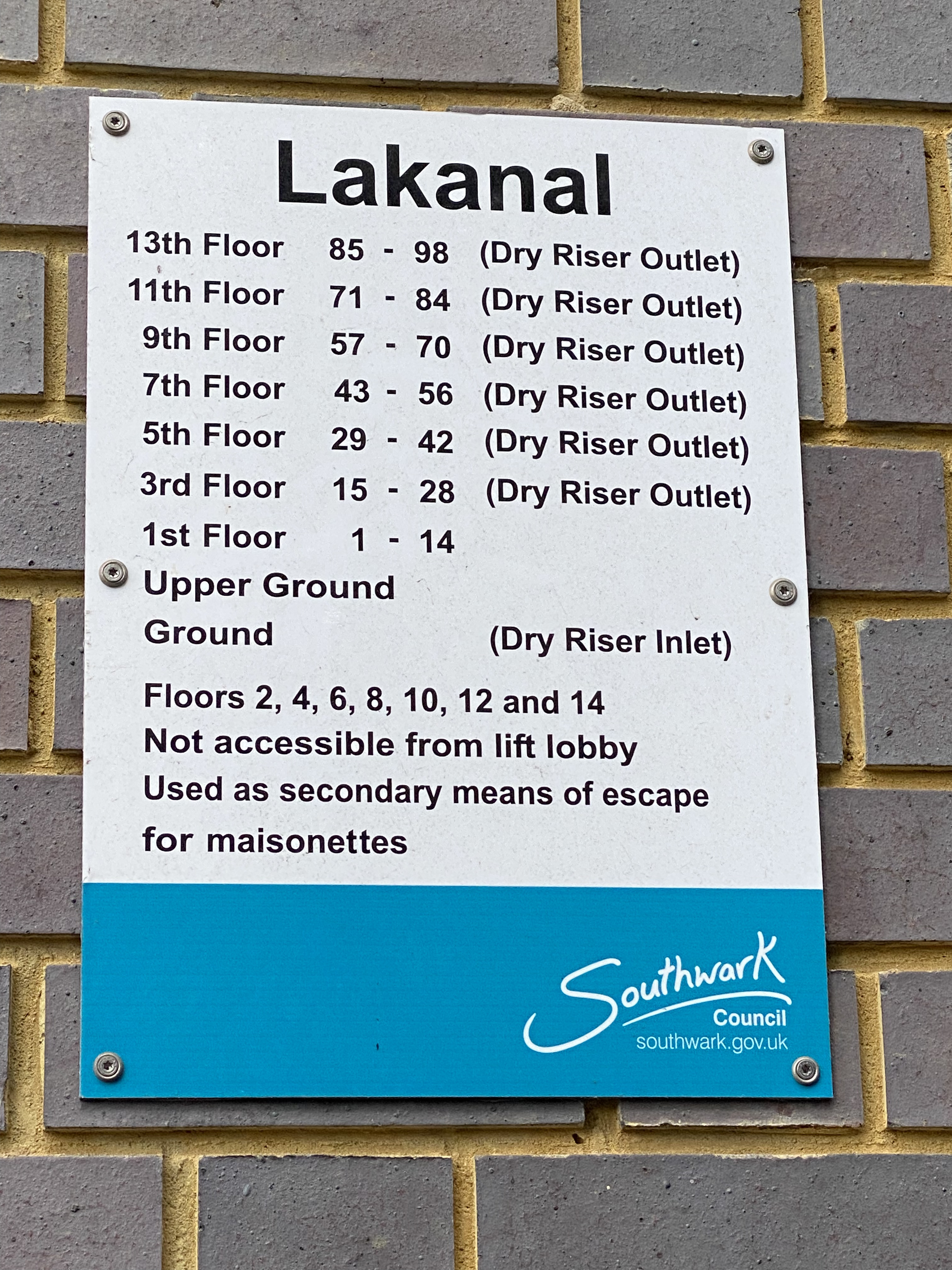
Sign giving exit details, in 2021

== Investigations ==
The Metropolitan Police launched an investigation into the fire, which was initially treated as "suspicious," but was later said to be due to an electrical fault in a television set.

=== Fire brigade ===
The London Fire Brigade also opened an investigation into the fire. It was revealed that Lakanal House had been identified as being at risk of enabling a fire to spread if one should occur in one of the flats. Southwark Council scheduled the building for demolition in 1999, although later it was decided not to demolish it. Although it was originally reported that some of the windows were uPVC, the windows in the block were in fact made of metal.

An inquest into the deaths at Lakanal House found that the rapid spread of the fire had trapped people in their homes. The exterior cladding panels had burned through in less than five minutes. As in the case of the Grenfell Tower fire eight years later, residents were advised to remain in their homes in the event of a fire. The inquest concluded that substandard renovations had removed fire-stopping material between flats, breaking compartmentation, and safety inspections carried out by Southwark council had not uncovered this problem.

== Aftermath ==
London Fire Brigade assistant commissioner Nick Collins described the event as "one of the most significant fires in some time in terms of lives lost". Around 150 people were evacuated or rescued from the flats, with fifty people being evacuated to nearby Welton Hall. The fire brigade was also criticised for the confusion among the 999 operators that urged some of the deceased victims to stay within their flats, and confusion amongst controllers who failed to promptly search flats in time, as they were confused about the layout of the flats.

=== Accommodation ===
Some of the residents found alternative accommodation with relatives although the majority were provided with accommodation by Southwark Council. Residents of the flats criticised the layout of the flats, which did not provide easy egress in case of an emergency. The flats also lacked a central fire alarm system, which was not required by virtue of the current Building Regulations Approved Document B for England And Wales. The regulations prevalent at the time of the construction of buildings of this age was far removed from the current state of regulation and control under Building Regulations. There had been calls in 2006 for the flats to be demolished. It was claimed that the residents had been told that the block could not be demolished because it was a listed building. Harriet Harman, in whose constituency the flats lie, announced that there would be a thorough investigation into the cause of the fire, and whether or not there were adequate fire-prevention measures.

A number of tower blocks of a similar design exist, such as the nearby Perronet House, also in Southwark. Perronet, however, has two staircases. Marie Curie House, also nearby, is of identical design to Lakanal.

Residents were rehoused elsewhere after the fire, and Lakanal House was boarded up. Refurbishment work commenced in 2015, with the block expected to reopen in 2017. Mayor of London Boris Johnson described the fire as an "horrendous incident" and announced an investigation into the design of the building, which has a single central staircase. London Assembly Planning and Housing Committee chairwoman Jenny Jones called for a public inquiry into the fire. Communities Secretary John Denham asked for an urgent report from the government's Chief Fire and Rescue Advisor. At a meeting of Southwark Council, Councillor Ian Wingfield called for a "full and independent public inquiry" into the fire. The Fire Brigades Union supported the call for a public inquiry. No public inquiry was conducted into the Lakanal House fire.

=== Settlement ===
Southwark Council pleaded guilty in 2017 to four charges concerning breaches to safety regulations. It was fined £270,000, reduced from £400,000 because it had pleaded guilty, plus £300,000 costs. The council expressed "sincere regret for the failures that were present in the building".

== See also ==
- Building regulations in the United Kingdom § Part B. Fire safety
- Fire escape
- Grenfell Tower fire, a similar tower block fire in 2017, caused by a faulty refrigerator
- Ronan Point
- Skyscraper fire
- Structural robustness
