= List of fires in high-rise buildings =

The following is a list of fires in high-rise buildings. A skyscraper fire or high-rise fire is a class of structural fire specific to tall buildings. Skyscraper fires are technically challenging for fire departments: they require unusually high degrees of organization and cooperation between participating firefighting units to contain and extinguish. Skyscraper fires are often multiple-alarm fires.

== Notable fires ==
| Building | Height (m) | City | Country | Date | Death(s) | Notes |
|---|---|---|---|---|---|---|
| Central Tower | 91 m | San Francisco | United States | April 18, 1906 | ? | Burned in the aftermath of the 1906 San Francisco earthquake |
| Merchants Exchange Building | 69 m | San Francisco | United States | April 18, 1906 | ? | Burned in the aftermath of the 1906 San Francisco earthquake |
| Old Chronicle Building | 95 m | San Francisco | United States | April 18, 1906 | ? | Burned in the aftermath of the 1906 San Francisco earthquake |
| Mutual Bank Building | | San Francisco | United States | April 18, 1906 | ? | Burned in the aftermath of the 1906 San Francisco earthquake |
| Asch Building | 48 m | New York City | United States | March 25, 1911 | 146 | Triangle Shirtwaist Factory fire |
| The Sherry-Netherland | 171 m | New York City | United States | April 12, 1927 | 0 | Occurred during construction |
| Empire State Building | 381 m | New York City | United States | July 28, 1945 | 14 | Plane crash due to thick fog |
| 40 Wall Street | 283 m | New York City | United States | May 20, 1946 | 5 | Plane crash |
| La Salle Hotel | | Chicago | United States | June 5, 1946 | 61 | Likely an electrical fire |
| Winecoff Hotel | 59 m | Atlanta | United States | December 7, 1946 | 119 | Deadliest hotel fire in U.S. history |
| Ronan Point | 64 m | London | United Kingdom | May 16, 1968 | 4 | Gas explosion caused partial collapse of the highrise. |
| 1 New York Plaza | 192 m | New York City | United States | August 5, 1970 | 2 | Sparked from a faulty computer connection |
| Taeyongak Hotel | 72.6 m | Seoul | South Korea | December 25, 1971 | 163 | Daeyeonggak Hotel fire, deadliest hotel fire in history |
| Andraus Building | 115 m | São Paulo | Brazil | February 24, 1972 | 16 | Sparked from an electrical overload |
| Rault Tower | | New Orleans | United States | November 29, 1972 | 6 | Suspected arson |
| Avianca Building | 161 m | Bogotá | Colombia | July 23, 1973 | 4 | Sparked on the 14th floor |
| City-Haus | 142 m | Frankfurt | West Germany | February 1, 1974 | 0 | Occurred during construction |
| Joelma Building | 82.5 m | São Paulo | Brazil | February 1, 1974 | 184 | 179–189, Joelma fire |
| 1 World Trade Center | 417 m | New York City | United States | February 13, 1975 | 0 | Arson |
| Campbell Shopping Complex | 66 m | Kuala Lumpur | Malaysia | April 8, 1976 | 1 | Campbell Shopping Complex fire |
| Bank Bumiputra | | Kuala Lumpur | Malaysia | November 4, 1980 | ? | |
| MGM Grand Hotel | 85.8 m | Las Vegas | United States | November 21, 1980 | 84 | MGM Grand fire |
| Las Vegas Hilton | 114 m | Las Vegas | United States | February 10, 1981 | 8 | Arson |
| Torre Santa María | | Santiago | Chile | March 21, 1981 | 11 | Occurred when carpet glue ignited during carpet installation. |
| Al Rasheed Hotel | 59.4 m | Baghdad | Iraq | July 21, 1982 | 1 | Plane crash-Suicide by F-4 Phantom during Iran-Iraq War |
| Northwestern National Bank | 52.8 m | Minneapolis | United States | November 25, 1982 | 0 | Minneapolis Thanksgiving Day fire |
| KOMTAR | 248.7 m | Penang | Malaysia | January 23, 1983 | 0 | Likely occurred due to welding sparks |
| Prudential Tower | 276 m | Boston | United States | January 2, 1983 | 0 | A nine-alarm fire in the building spread because of the lack of a sprinkler system. |
| Dupont Plaza Hotel | 74 m | Condado | Puerto Rico | December 31, 1986 | 97 | Dupont Plaza Hotel arson |
| Schomburg Plaza | | New York City | United States | March 22, 1987 | 7 | Ignited from the plaza's trash compactor room |
| Hotel International | 85 m | Zurich | Switzerland | February 14, 1988 | 6 | Deadliest high-rise fire in Swiss history |
| First Interstate Tower | 261.52 m | Los Angeles | United States | May 4, 1988 | 1 | First Interstate Tower fire |
| Peachtree 25th Building | 33 m | Atlanta | United States | June 30, 1989 | 5 | Peachtree 25th Building fire |
| One Meridian Plaza | 150 m | Philadelphia | United States | February 23, 1991 | 3 | Occurred when rags ignited, fire spread uncontrollably after all fire protection systems failed. Later torn down. |
| UNITIC Twin Towers | 105.5 m | Sarajevo | Bosnia and Herzegovina | May 28, 1992 | * | Burned after being repeatedly hit by Serbian incendiary tank shells. |
| Executive Council Building | 69.3 m | Sarajevo | Bosnia and Herzegovina | May 28, 1992 | * | Burned after being repeatedly hit by Serbian incendiary tank shells. |
| Groeneveen and Kruitberg | 33 m | Amsterdam | Netherlands | October 4, 1992 | 43 | El Al Flight 1862 plane crash, Partial collapse |
| 1 World Trade Center | 417 m | New York City | United States | February 26, 1993 | 6 | Bombing which also resulted in 1,042 smoke related injuries |
| Stratosphere Tower | 350.2 m | Las Vegas | United States | August 30, 1993 | 0 | Occurred during construction |
| White House (Moscow) | 119 m | Moscow | Russia | October 8, 1993 | 147 | Caught fire from tank shelling during the 1993 Russian constitutional crisis |
| Hotel Olympik | 73 m | Prague | Czech Republic | May 25, 1995 | 8 | Occurred on the 11th floor within a janitor's closet |
| Tower 42 | 183 m | London | United Kingdom | January 17, 1996 | 0 | Occurred during refurbishment |
| Garley Building | 52.8 m | Hong Kong | British Hong Kong | November 20, 1996 | 41 | 1996 Garley Building fire |
| Ušće Tower | 115 m | Belgrade | Serbia and Montenegro | April 21, 1999 | 0 | Struck by NATO air strikes during the Kosovo War setting the upper floors on fire. |
| Immigration Tower | 181 m | Hong Kong | Hong Kong | August 2, 2000 | 2 | Arson |
| Ostankino Tower | 540.1 m | Moscow | Russia | August 27, 2000 | 3 | Tallest structure in Europe |
| 1 and 2 World Trade Center | 417 m / 415.1 m | New York City | United States | September 11, 2001 | 2,312 | Part of the September 11 attacks. One hijacked airliner was deliberately flown into each of the skyscrapers. Both towers experienced a total structural failure within two hours of the plane impacts. Tallest buildings to ever be destroyed. |
| 7 World Trade Center | 190 m | New York City | United States | September 11, 2001 | 0 | Caused by debris from the collapse of Building 1 (North Tower) of the World Trade Center, resulting in this building also collapsing. |
| 90 West Street | 98.76 m | New York City | United States | September 11, 2001 | 2 | Caused by debris from the collapse of Building 2 (South Tower) of the World Trade Center |
| 130 Cedar Street | 50 m | New York City | United States | September 11, 2001 | 0 | Caused by debris from the collapse of Building 2 (South Tower) of the World Trade Center |
| The Pentagon | 23 m | Arlington County, Virginia | United States | September 11, 2001 | 125 | Part of the September 11 attacks. Caused damaged at the southwestern side from one hijacked airliner Flight 77 of the impact and partial collapse. |
| Pirelli Tower | 127 m | Milan | Italy | April 18, 2002 | 3 | Plane crash |
| Cook County Administration Building | | Chicago | United States | October 17, 2003 | 6 | Seven other seriously injured, fire thought to have been arson |
| Al Rasheed Hotel | 59.4 m | Baghdad | Iraq | December 26, 2003 | 1 | Twenty-eight 68 mm and 85 mm Katyusha rockets were fired at and struck the hotel |
| Parque Central Complex east tower | 255 m | Caracas | Venezuela | October 17, 2004 | 0 | Damage to 34th-44th floors |
| LaSalle National Bank Building | 163.1 m | Chicago | United States | December 7, 2004 | 0 | 25 injured |
| Harrow Court | 56.1 m | Hertfordshire | United Kingdom | February 2, 2005 | 3 | Harrow Court fire |
| Windsor Tower | 106 m | Madrid | Spain | February 12, 2005 | 0 | Partially collapsed; subsequently demolished |
| 9th District | 58 m | Paris | France | April 15, 2005 | 24 | 2005 Paris fires |
| 13th District | 58 m | Paris | France | August 26, 2005 | 7 | 2005 Paris fires |
| 3rd District | 58 m | Paris | France | August 30, 2005 | 17 | 2005 Paris fires |
| Tohid Town Residential | 33 m | Tehran | Iran | December 6, 2005 | 106 | Plane crash: 2005 Iranian Air Force C-130 crash |
| Transport Tower | 112.2 m | Astana | Kazakhstan | May 30, 2006 | 0 | Fire destroyed upper floors of 34-story government building |
| Belaire Apartments | 156 m | New York City | United States | October 11, 2006 | 2 | Plane crash |
| Fortune Tower | | Dubai | United Arab Emirates | January 18, 2007 | 4 | Occurred during construction, 57 injured |
| Shanghai World Financial Center | 494.3 m | Shanghai | China | August 14, 2007 | 0 | Occurred on 40th floor during construction |
| Deutsche Bank Building | 157.6 m | New York City | United States | August 18, 2007 | 2 | Occurred during dismantling, demolished due to damage from the September 11 attacks |
| The Water Club | 125.4 m | Atlantic City | United States | September 23, 2007 | 0 | Occurred during construction. |
| Monte Carlo Resort and Casino | 110 m | Las Vegas | United States | January 25, 2008 | 0 | Fire affecting top six floors |
| TU Delft Faculteitsgebouw Bouwkunde | 56 m | Delft | The Netherlands | April 13, 2008 | 0 | A broken water pipe on the 8th floor caused a short circuit in a coffee machine a floor below, resulting in a fire. The building was demolished afterwards. |
| Abraj Al Bait Towers | 601 m | Mecca | Saudi Arabia | October 28, 2008 | 0 | Occurred during construction; fire consumed nine floors |
| Beijing Television Cultural Center | 159 m | Beijing | China | February 9, 2009 | 1 | Beijing Television Cultural Center fire |
| Bashundhara City Tower | 62.7 m | Dhaka | Bangladesh | March 13, 2009 | 4 | |
| Abraj Al Bait Towers | | Mecca | Saudi Arabia | May 1, 2009 | 0 | Occurred during construction |
| Lakanal House | 46.2 m | London | United Kingdom | July 3, 2009 | 6 | Lakanal House fire |
| Rabobank Bestuurscentrum | 105 m | Utrecht | Netherlands | June 27, 2010 | 0 | Occurred on the 25th and 26th floor during the construction. The exact cause of the fire has never been identified. |
| Wooshin Golden Suites | | Busan | South Korea | September 1, 2010 | 0 | Wooshin Golden Suites fire |
| Dijon residential complex | 79.2 m | Dijon | France | October 14, 2010 | 7 | |
| Unnamed high-rise apartment block | 85 m | Shanghai | China | November 15, 2010 | 58 | Occurred during renovation; 2010 Shanghai fire |
| Dynasty Wanxin building complex Towers A and B (Tower C was unaffected) | | Shenyang | China | February 3, 2011 | 0 | Started from fireworks during Chinese New Year Celebrations. |
| EVN Headquarters Tower 1 | 147 m | Hanoi | Vietnam | December 16, 2011 | 0 | Fire occurred during construction, 11 workers injured. |
| Uncompleted high rise block | | Kuala Lumpur | Malaysia | January 18, 2012 | 0 | |
| Fico Place | | Bangkok | Thailand | March 3, 2012 | 0 | Two firemen injured |
| Federation Tower (East Tower) | 450 m | Moscow | Russia | April 2, 2012 | 0 | Occurred while the building was under construction |
| Al Tayer Tower | | Sharjah | United Arab Emirates | April 28, 2012 | 0 | |
| Polat Tower Residence | 140 m | Istanbul | Turkey | July 17, 2012 | 0 | |
| Tamweel Tower | 160 m | Dubai | United Arab Emirates | November 18, 2012 | 0 | |
| Oko Tower 1 | 354.1 m | Moscow | Russia | January 25, 2013 | 0 | Fire occurred on 24th floor during construction, one worker was injured. |
| Torre Ejecutiva Pemex Tower | 214 m | Mexico City | Mexico | January 31, 2013 | 33 | Gas explosion affecting the main building's 14-story annex Torre Ejecutiva Pemex explosion |
| Grozny-City Towers | 150 m | Grozny | Russia | April 3, 2013 | 0 | |
| Guangzhou Jianye Building Fire | | Guangzhou | China | April 3, 2013 | 0 | |
| The Strand | | New York City | United States | January 5, 2014 | 1 | |
| One57 | 306 m | New York City | United States | March 14, 2014 | 0 | Fire broke out in the loading dock, then spread to the courtyard and a neighboring property. |
| Mermoz Tower | 52.8 m | Roubaix | France | May 14, 2012 | 0 | |
| Lotus Park building | | Mumbai | India | July 18, 2014 | 1 | |
| Lacrosse Apartments | | Melbourne | Australia | November 25, 2014 | 0 | Fire started on an 8th floor balcony and rapidly spread up the facade cladding. |
| The Wedgwood | 30 m | Castle Hills | United States | December 28, 2014 | 5 | The fire occurred on one wing of the third floor causing extensive smoke damage. |
| The Marina Torch | 336.8 m | Dubai | United Arab Emirates | February 21, 2015 | 0 | At least 7 people were injured. |
| Wisma Kosgoro | | Jakarta | Indonesia | March 10, 2015 | 0 | Fire destroyed floors 16–20. |
| Franklin Tower, 100-101 Terr. Boieldieu, Tower A | 120 m | Puteaux, Paris | France | March 17, 2015 | 0 | Unstated cause, ignition on 40th flr in technical room, contained by 30 firefighters via internal wet column (a pressurized vertical pipe). |
| Unnamed Highrise | | Baku | Azerbaijan | May 19, 2015 | 16 | See 2015 Baku residence building fire |
| Cosmopolitan of Las Vegas | 184 m | Las Vegas | United States | July 25, 2015 | 0 | Fire occurred on the pool deck fueled by cabanas and artificial trees; two people were treated for smoke inhalation. |
| Unnamed Residential Tower | | Sharjah | United Arab Emirates | October 1, 2015 | 0 | Fire burned building facade, 19 treated for smoke inhalation. |
| John Hancock Center | 457 m | Chicago | United States | November 21, 2015 | 0 | A two-alarm fire broke out on the 50th floor. Five injured. |
| The Address Downtown Dubai | 306.2 m | Dubai | United Arab Emirates | December 31, 2015 | 1 | Occurred on New Year's Eve, 14 injured. |
| Tour Anvers (in Les Olympiades residential complex) | 104 m | Paris | France | January 12, 2016 | 1 | 16th of 31 flrs, contained to apt without spreading, 1 killed, 31-year-old woman with muscle disability. |
| An unidentified tower on avenue Romain-Rolland | 33 m | Saint-Denis | France | January 13, 2016 | 1 | |
| 158 bd Davout | 21 m | Paris 20e | France | June 1, 2016 | 1 | 3rd through 7th of 7 flrs, 8 injured. |
| Sulafa Tower | 288 m | Dubai | UAE | July 20, 2016 | 0 | |
| Plasco Building | 42 m | Tehran | Iran | January 19, 2017 | 21 | The 17-story building collapsed after a fire started on the ninth floor. Seventy injured. |
| Grenfell Tower | 79.2 m | London | United Kingdom | June 14, 2017 | 72 | The 24-storey tower block fire spread from the second floor to the top of the building. See Grenfell Tower fire |
| Pamchal Chitgar Building | 66 m | Tehran | Iran | June 14, 2017 | 0 | The residential 20-storey tower – four injured |
| Marco Polo Apartments | 118.8 m | Honolulu | United States | July 14, 2017 | 3 | Blaze started on the 26th floor of the 36-story apartments. Fire quickly spread to three more floors, making it a 5-alarm fire. This is the deadliest high-rise fire in Hawaii's history. |
| Rotana Hotel Building | 66 m | Mashhad | Iran | July 22, 2017 | 0 | Under construction 20-storey hotel |
| The Marina Torch | 336.8 m | Dubai | United Arab Emirates | August 4, 2017 | 0 | |
| Trump Tower | 202 m | New York City | United States | April 7, 2018 | 1 | 6 firefighters injured |
| Almas Tower | 360 m | Dubai | United Arab Emirates | April 30, 2018 | 0 | |
| Trump International Hotel and Tower (Baku) | 108.9 m | Baku | Azerbaijan | April 30, 2018 | 0 | Involved two separate fires the same day |
| Wilton Paes de Almeida Building | 79.2 m | São Paulo | Brazil | April 30, 2018 | 8 | 7–9, building collapsed shortly after blaze |
| Paramis Building | 69.3 m | Tehran | Iran | July 22, 2018 | 0 | 21-storey residential building |
| Bank of Lisbon building | 108 m | Johannesburg | South Africa | September 6, 2018 | 3 | Building demolished/Imploded on November 24, 2019 |
| FR Tower | | Dhaka | Bangladesh | March 28, 2019 | 25 | FR Tower fire |
| AXA Equitable Center | 229.3 m | New York City | United States | June 10, 2019 | 1 | 2019 New York City helicopter crash |
| Unnamed Highrise | 47.9 m | Prešov | Slovakia | December 6, 2019 | 8 | Natural gas explosion, 40 injuries |
| Abbco Tower | 190 m | Sharjah | United Arab Emirates | May 5, 2020 | 1 | 25 injuries, likely started by a discarded cigarette or shisha coals |
| Tower block at 1158 Nerudova street | 42.9 m | Czech Republic | Czech Republic | August 8, 2020 | 11 | Bohumín arson attack |
| Ulsan Samhwan Art Nouveau apartment building | 108.9 m | South Korea | South Korea | October 9, 2020 | 0 | 92 residents and 1 firefighter injured. Ulsan Samhwan Art Nouveau Fire |
| Helsinki Tower, 50 rue du Disque | ~100 m | Paris | France | August 13, 2021 | 1 | 18th of 33 flrs, apt possibly linked to Diogenes syndrome (hoarding), spread prevented via compartmentation, contained after 2 hrs, ~70 firefighters, 2 hoses, 1 killed (carbonized body), 4 injured (2 were firefighters with heatstroke). |
| Torre dei Moro | 60 m | Milan | Italy | August 29, 2021 | 0 | Fire event similar to the Grenfell Tower disaster |
| Cheng Chung Cheng Building | | Kaohsiung | Taiwan | October 14, 2021 | 46 | 2021 Kaohsiung tower fire |
| World Trade Centre Hong Kong | | Hong Kong | Hong Kong | December 15, 2021 | 0 | 13 injured, over 300 trapped on roof |
| Twin Parks North West, Site 4 | | New York City | United States | January 9, 2022 | 17 | 2022 Bronx apartment fire |
| Lotus Garden China Telecom Building | 218 m | Changsha, Hunan | China | September 16, 2022 | 0 | (fire extinguished. Under investigation.) |
| The Centaurus | 110 m | Islamabad | Pakistan | October 9, 2022 | 0 | 2022 The Centaurus Mall Fire Incident |
| Elite Concept | 80 m | İstanbul | Turkey | October 15, 2022 | 0 | Originated from external cladding. |
| RiverCourt | 108.1 m | New York City | United States | November 5, 2022 | 0 | |
| 8 Boulevard Walk | 123 m | Dubai | United Arab Emirates | November 7, 2022 | 0 | |
| Jixiangyuan community | ~60 m (21 floors) | Ürümqi | China | November 26, 2022 | 11 | 2022 Ürümqi fire |
| The Kimpton | 175 m | Hong Kong | Hong Kong | March 2, 2023 | 0 | Occurred during construction |
| Unnamed Apartment Block | | Hanoi | Vietnam | September 12, 2023 | 56 | 2023 Hanoi building fire |
| Greater Nile Petroleum Oil Company Tower | 65.72 m | Khartoum | Sudan | September 17, 2023 | ? | Occurred during War in Sudan (2023) |
| Unnamed Highrise | | València | Spain | February 22, 2024 | 10 | 2024 València residential complex fire |
| Unnamed Highrise | | Nanjing | China | February 23, 2024 | 15 | 2024 Nanjing building fire |
| Green Cozy Cottage Shopping Mall | | Dhaka | Bangladesh | February 29, 2024 | 46 | 2024 Dhaka Bailey Road fire |
| | | Tver | Russia | March 14, 2024 | 0 | Occurred during construction |
| Botanik Torre Flora | | Recife | Brazil | March 28, 2024 | 0 | Occurred during construction |
| Asia of Ivry (fr, Asie d'Ivry) | 21 m | Paris | France | September 17, 2024 | 0 | Wholesaler Chinese Pastry, 50 Av. de la Prte d'Ivry, 7th flr (attic) |
| The 12th District Town Hall | 36 m | Paris | France | January 27, 2025 | 0 | Top flrs, possible electrical short in attic, 150 firefighters saved main structure, tower stabilized after collapse risk. |
| Grand Kartal Hotel | 43.50 m | Bolu | Turkey | January 21, 2025 | 79 | 2025 Kartalkaya hotel fire |
| Marina Pinnacle | 280 m | Dubai | United Arab Emirates | June 13, 2025 | 0 | |
| 18 Jardin de Guillaume Bouzignac/18 Mail Gustave Flaubert | 60 m | Tours, Indre-et-Loire | France | October 10, 2025 | 1 | |
| Tuzla Retirement Home | | Tuzla | Bosnia and Herzegovina | November 4, 2025 | 17 | Tuzla retirement home fire |
| Vjesnik Building | | Zagreb | Croatia | November 17, 2025 | 0 | Fire started at the 15th floor by high school students. The building was vacant at the time of the fire, and will be demolished. |
| Wang Fuk Court | 93-108.5 m | Tai Po | Hong Kong | November 26, 2025 | 168 | Wang Fuk Court fire Deadliest apartment fire in history |
| 11 Thorncliffe Park Drive | | Toronto | Canada | November 27, 2025 | 0 | Stubborn 5-alarm fire burning inside walls and electrical conduit. All 408 units evacuated. |
| Era View Tower | | Manama | Bahrain | February 28, 2026 | 0 | Fire following an Iranian suicide drone attack |
| Burj Al Arab | 321 m | Dubai | United Arab Emirates | March 1, 2026 | 0 | Fire following an Iranian suicide drone attack |
| PIFSS Headquarters | | Kuwait City | Kuwait | March 8, 2026 | 0 | Fire following an Iranian suicide drone attack |
| Address Grand Creek Harbour Tower 2 | 266 m | Dubai | United Arab Emirates | March 11, 2026 | 0 | Fire following an Iranian suicide drone attack |
| 6 East 43rd Street | | New York City | United States | March 17, 2026 | 0 | Fire started in an HVAC system on the roof. Building was in the New York City St. Patrick's Day Parade's route. |
| | | Taiyuan | China | March 28, 2026 | 3 | 3 dead and 23 injured |
| Building 8 of the Shuangyunli residential complex | | Hangzhou | China | September 23, 2026 | | |
| Total (minus deaths caused by September 11) | | | | | 2072 | |

- During the violent civil war the building was likely vacated before the shelling that started the fires.

== Gallery ==
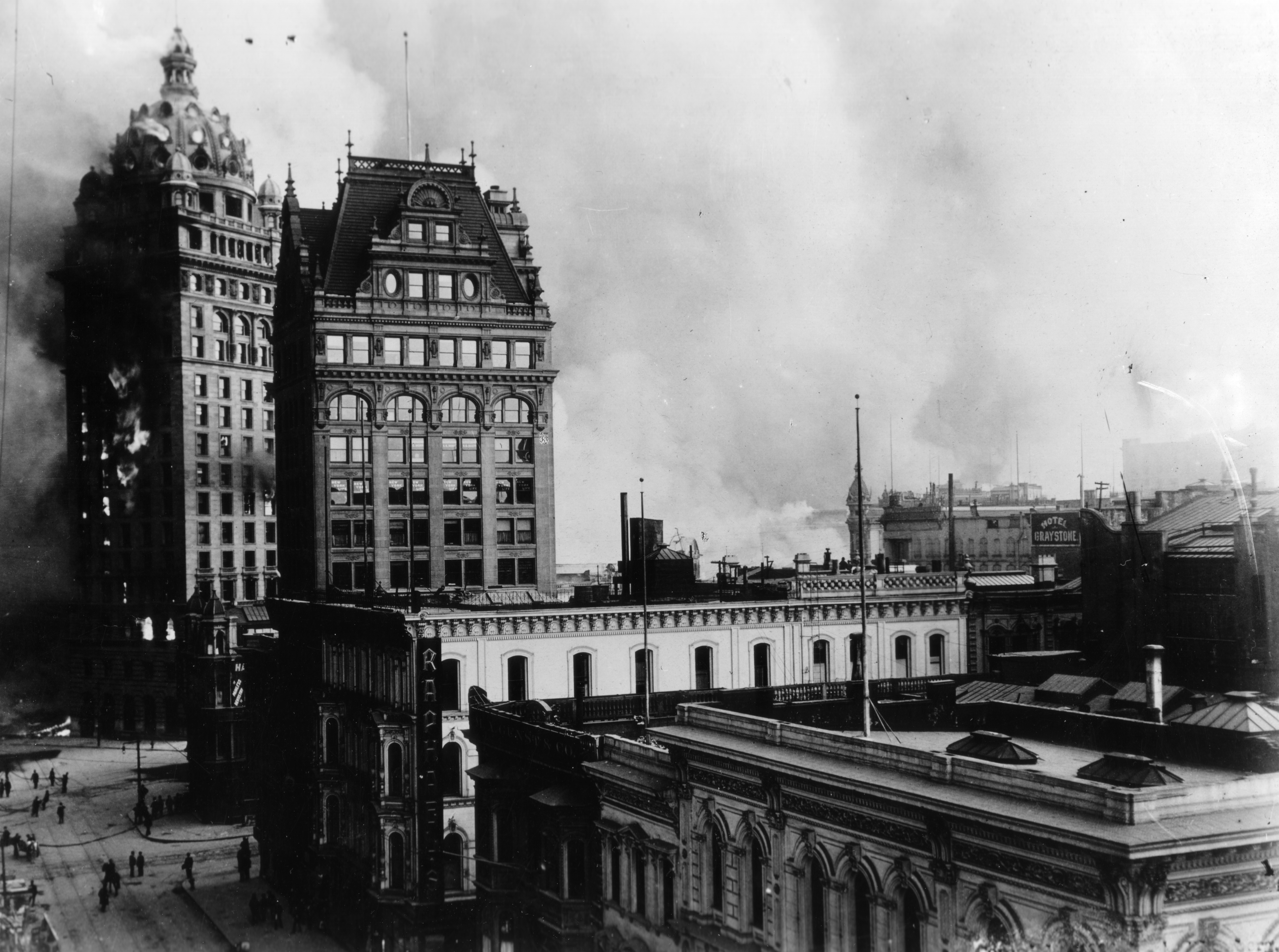
Central Tower burns after the 1906 San Francisco earthquake

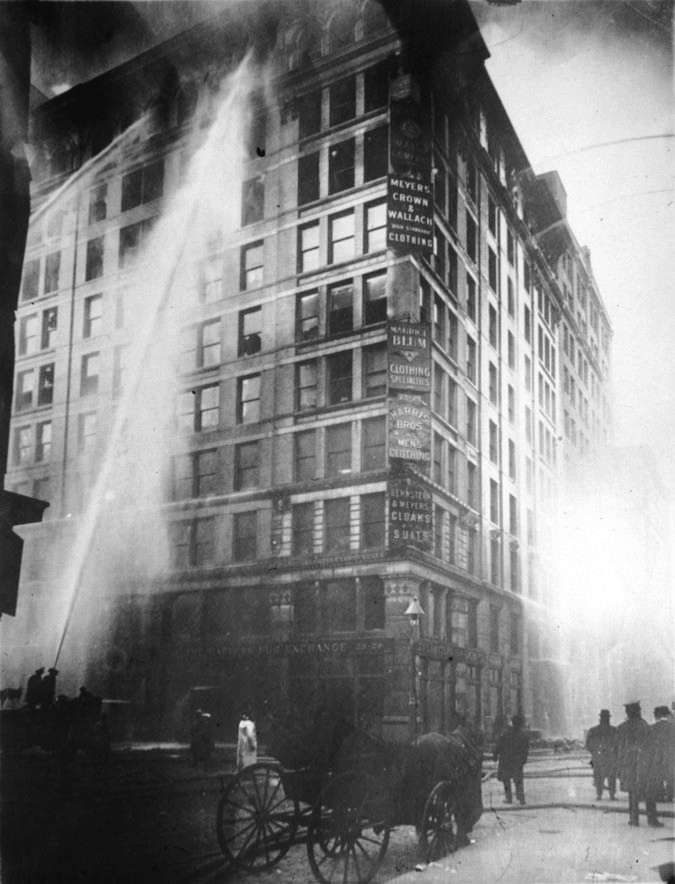
Triangle Shirtwaist Factory fire in 1911

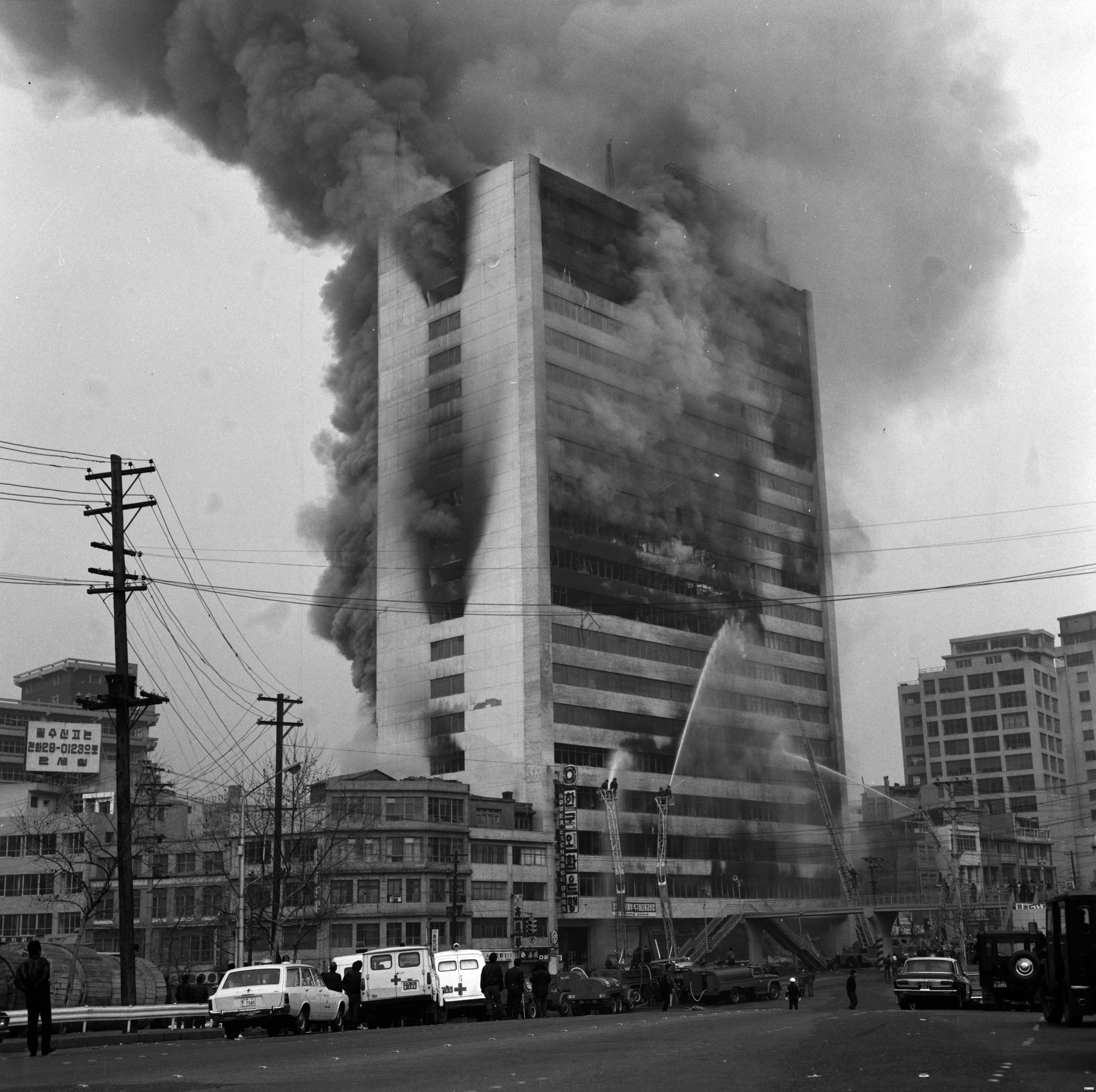
Daeyeonggak Hotel fire in 1971

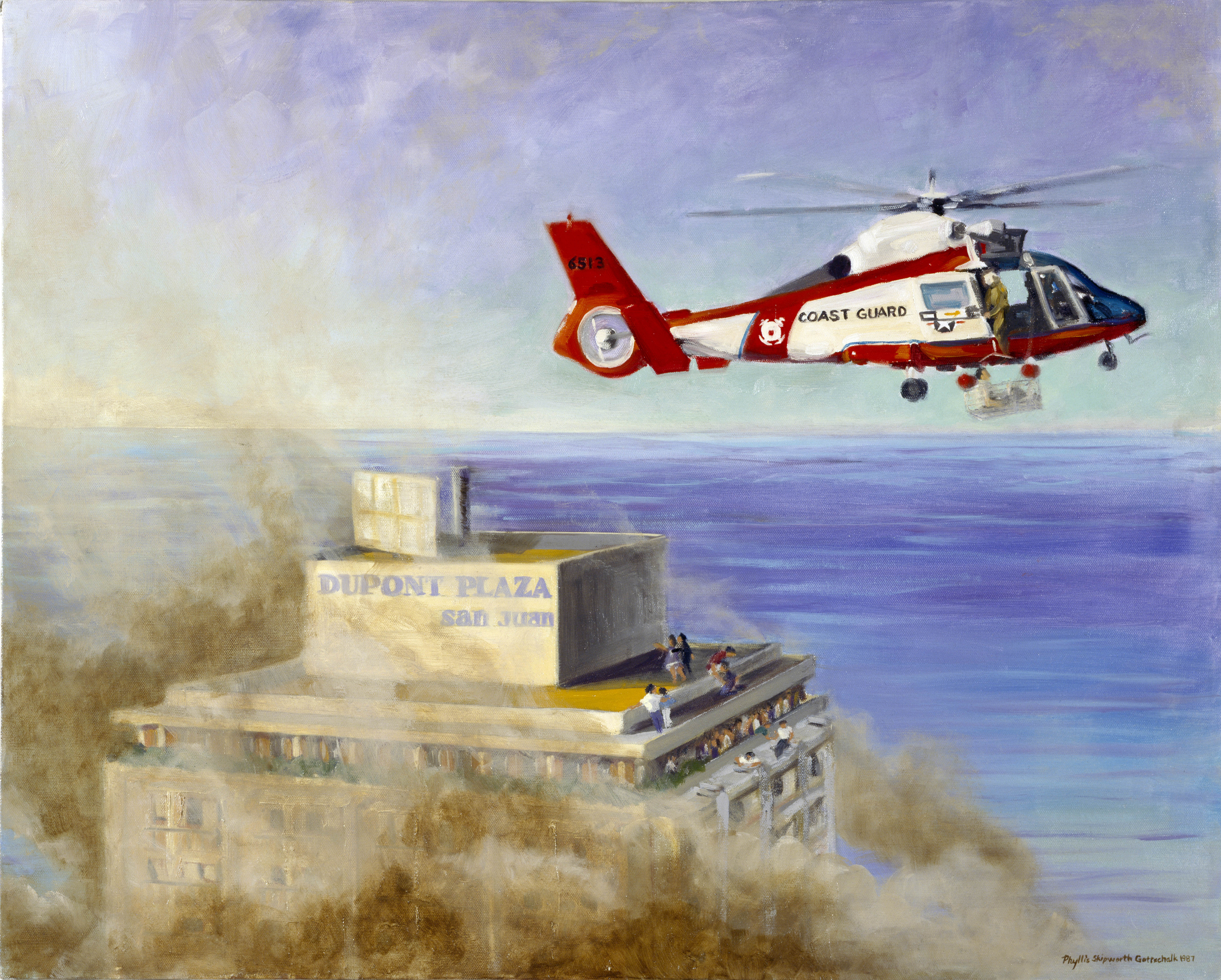
Dupont Plaza Hotel arson in 1986

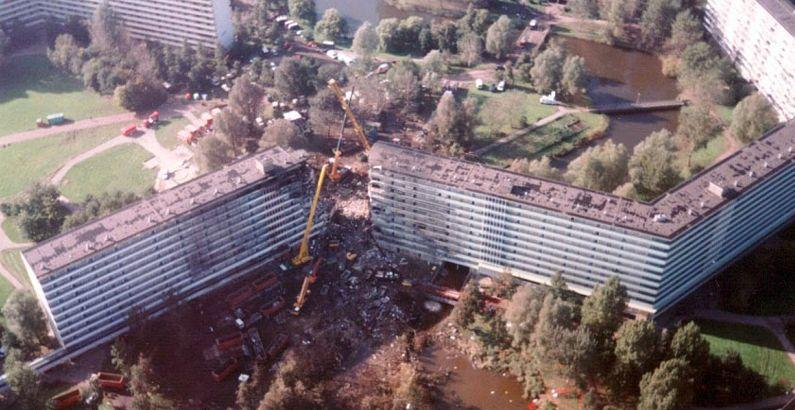
Aftermath of the El Al Flight 1862 crash in 1992

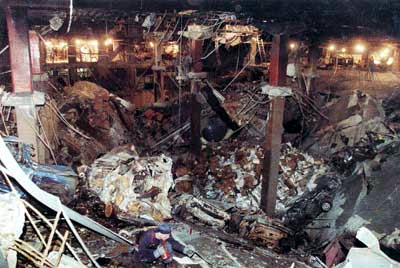
Aftermath of the 1993 World Trade Center bombing

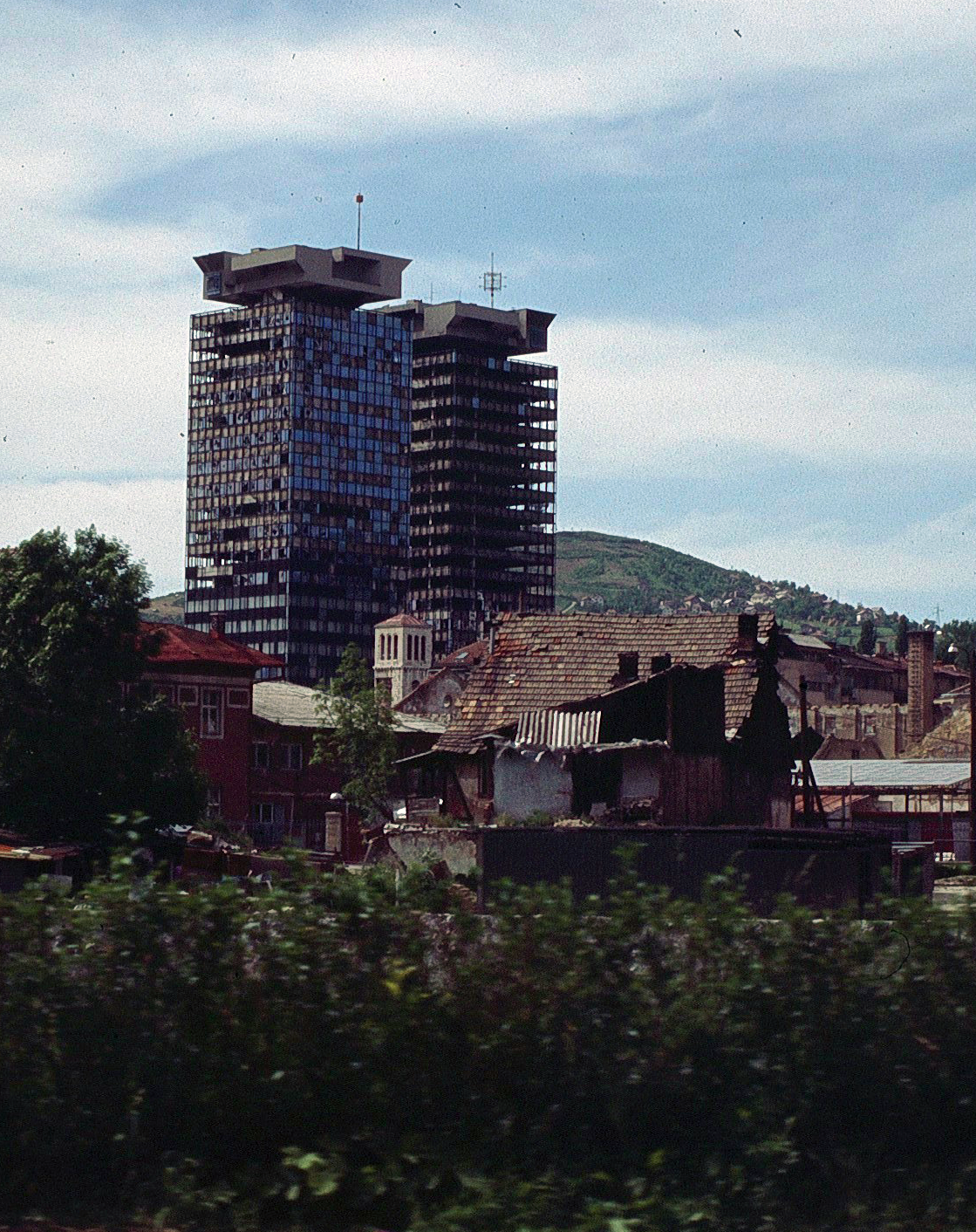
UNITIC Twin Skyscrapers after the Siege of Sarajevo in 1992

Executive Council Building during the Siege of Sarajevo in 1992

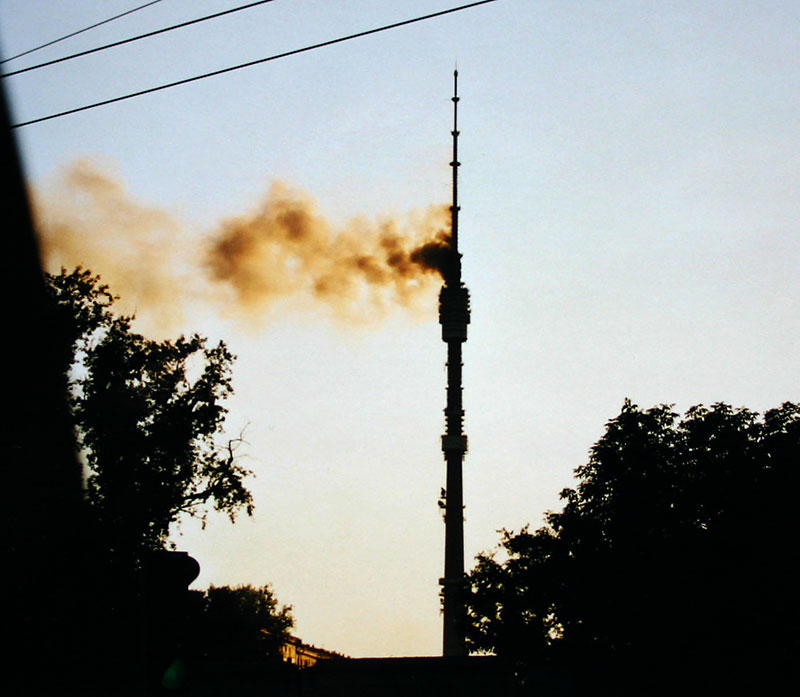
Ostankino Tower fire in 2000

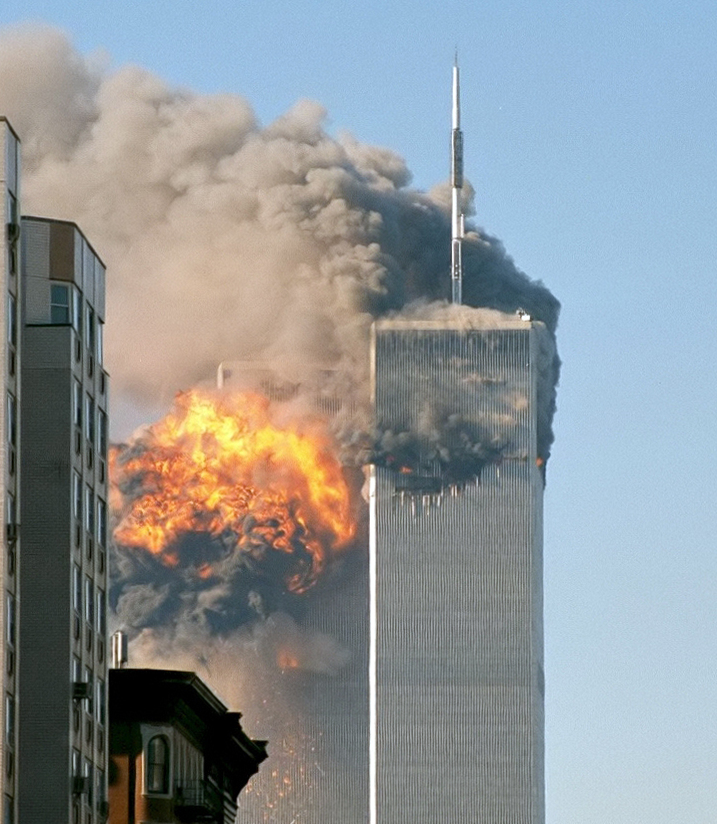
2 World Trade Center (South Tower) immediately after being struck by United Airlines Flight 175, with its twin already burning, in the September 11 attacks

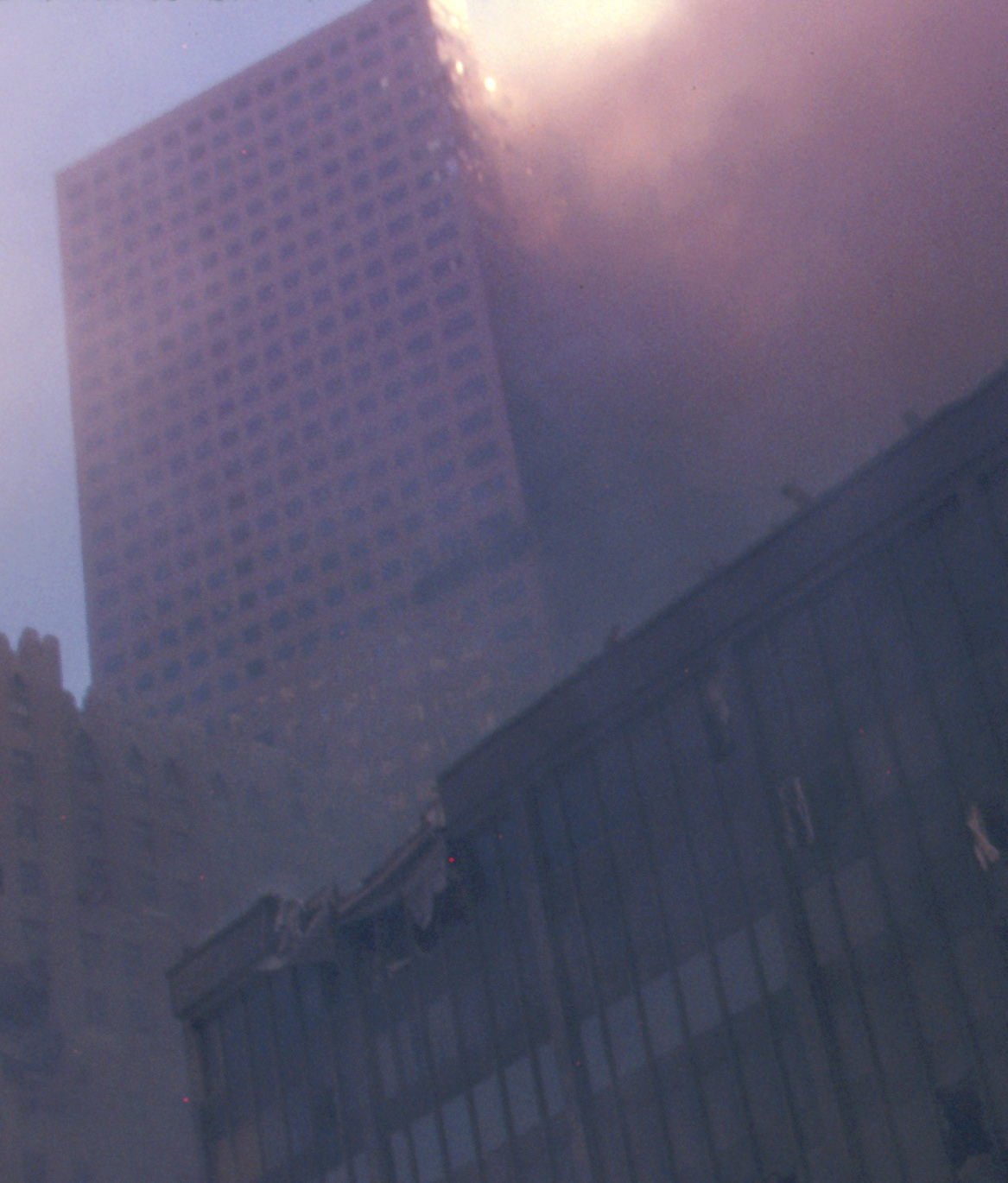
7 World Trade Center burns after the collapse of the Twin Towers

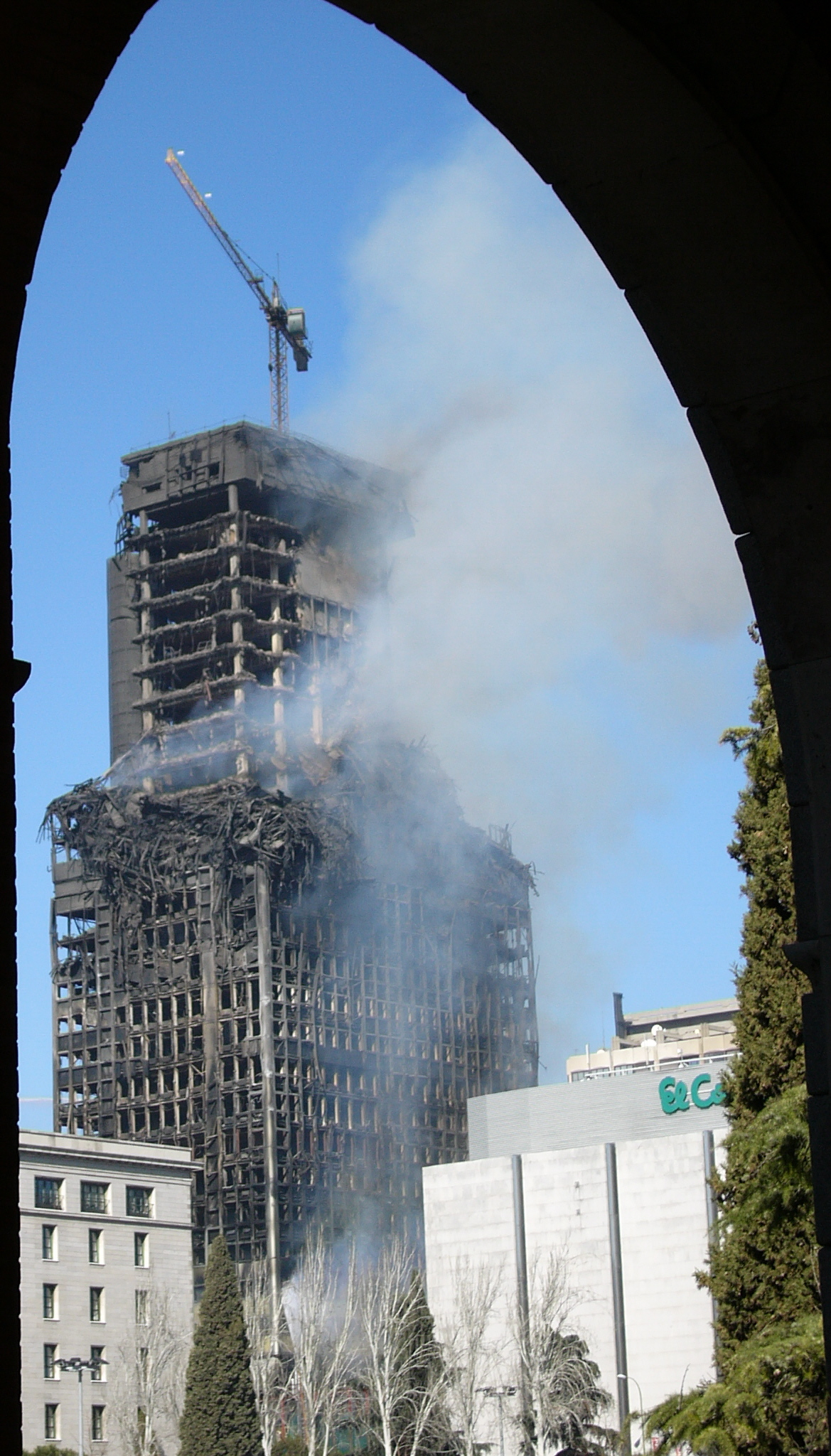
Windsor Tower after the 2005 fire

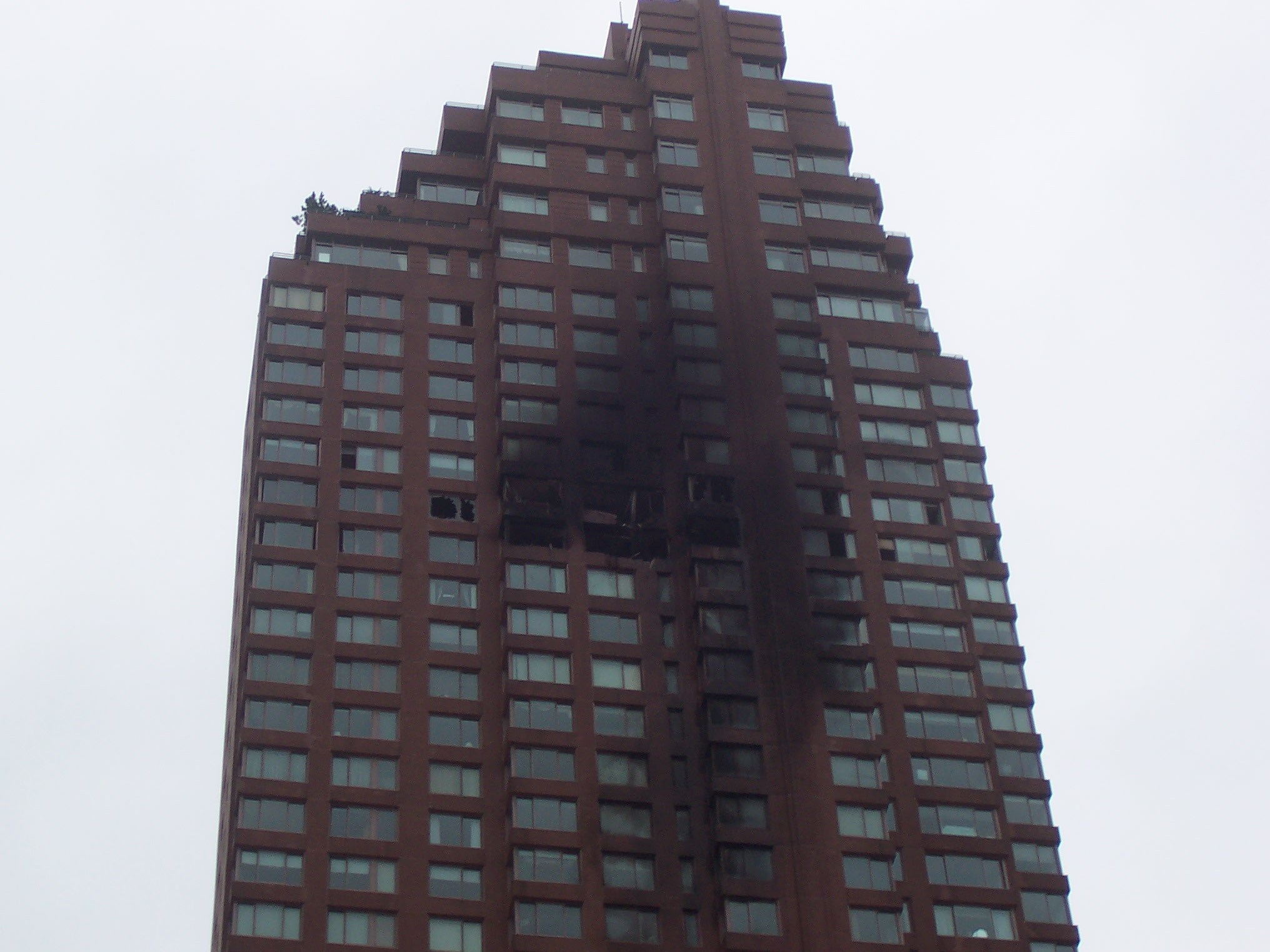
Aftermath of the 2006 New York City plane crash

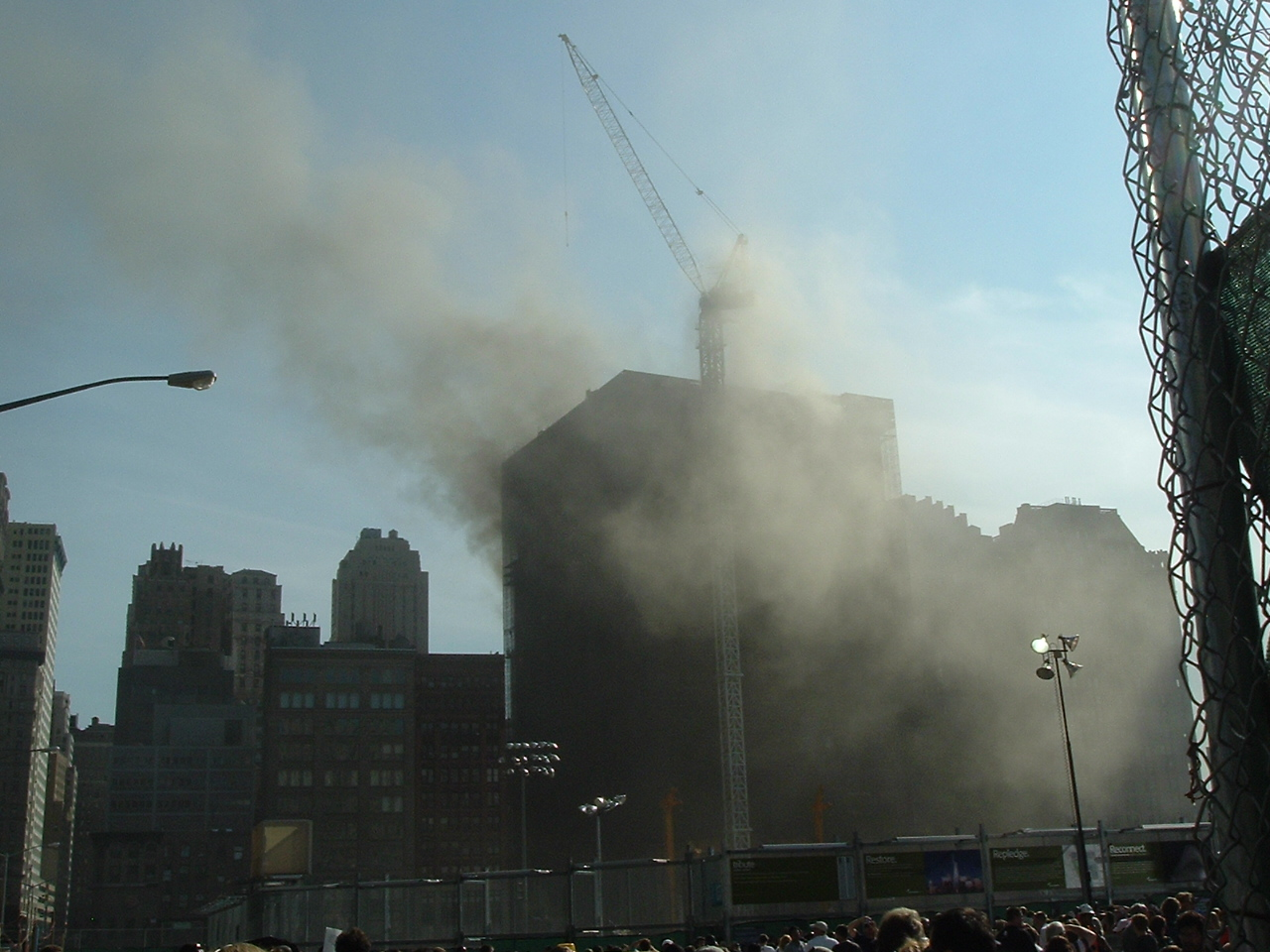
Deutsche Bank Building fire in 2007

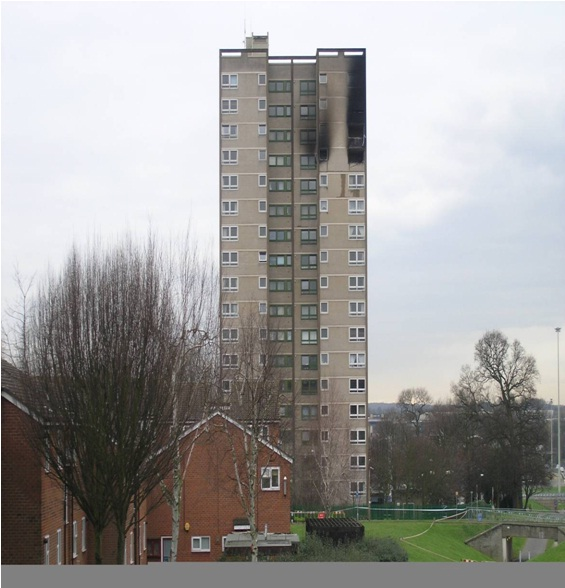
Aftermath of the Harrow Court fire in 2007

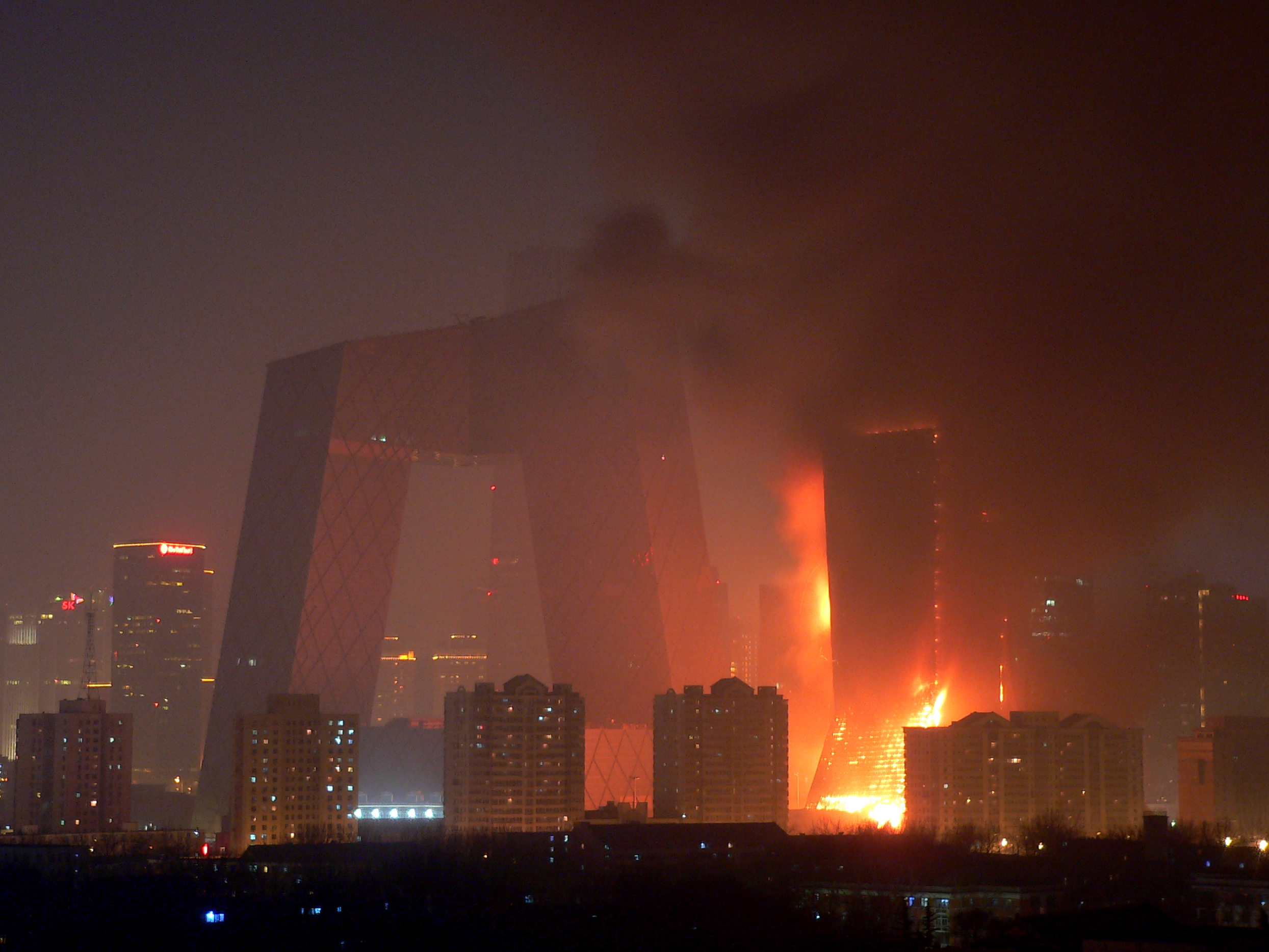
Beijing Television Cultural Center fire in 2009

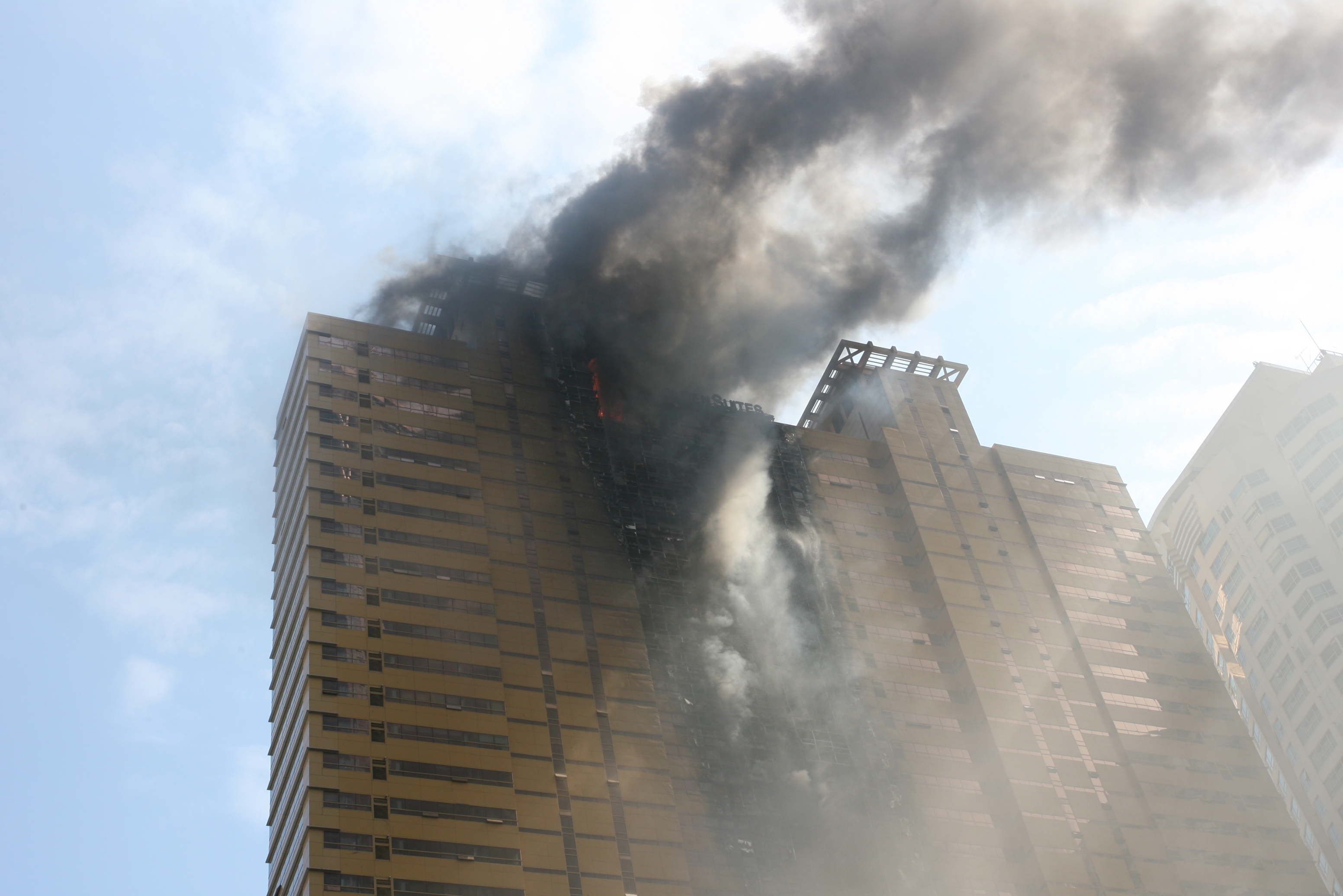
Wooshin Golden Suites fire in 2010

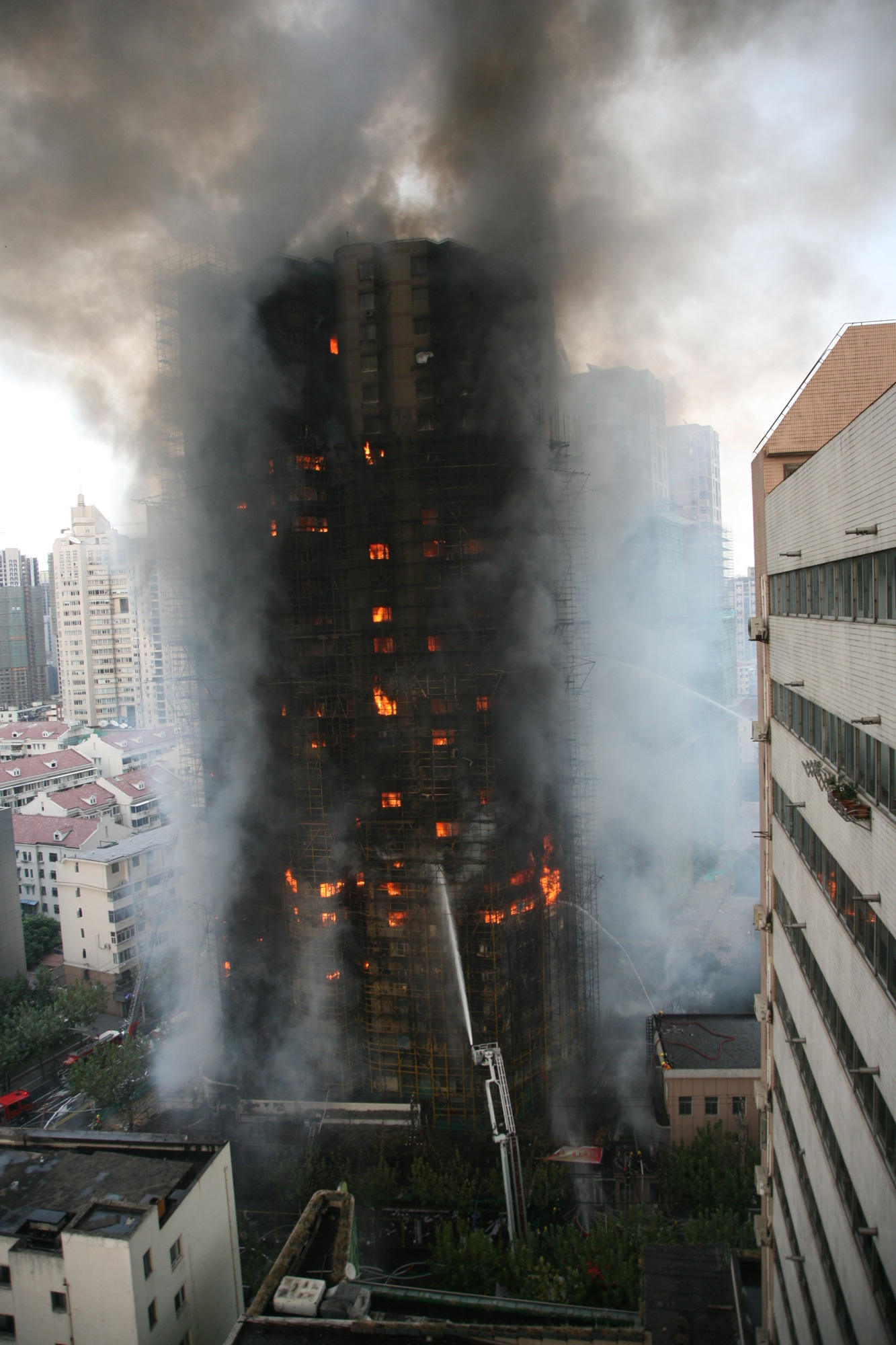
2010 Shanghai fire

A video showing 2010 Shanghai fire

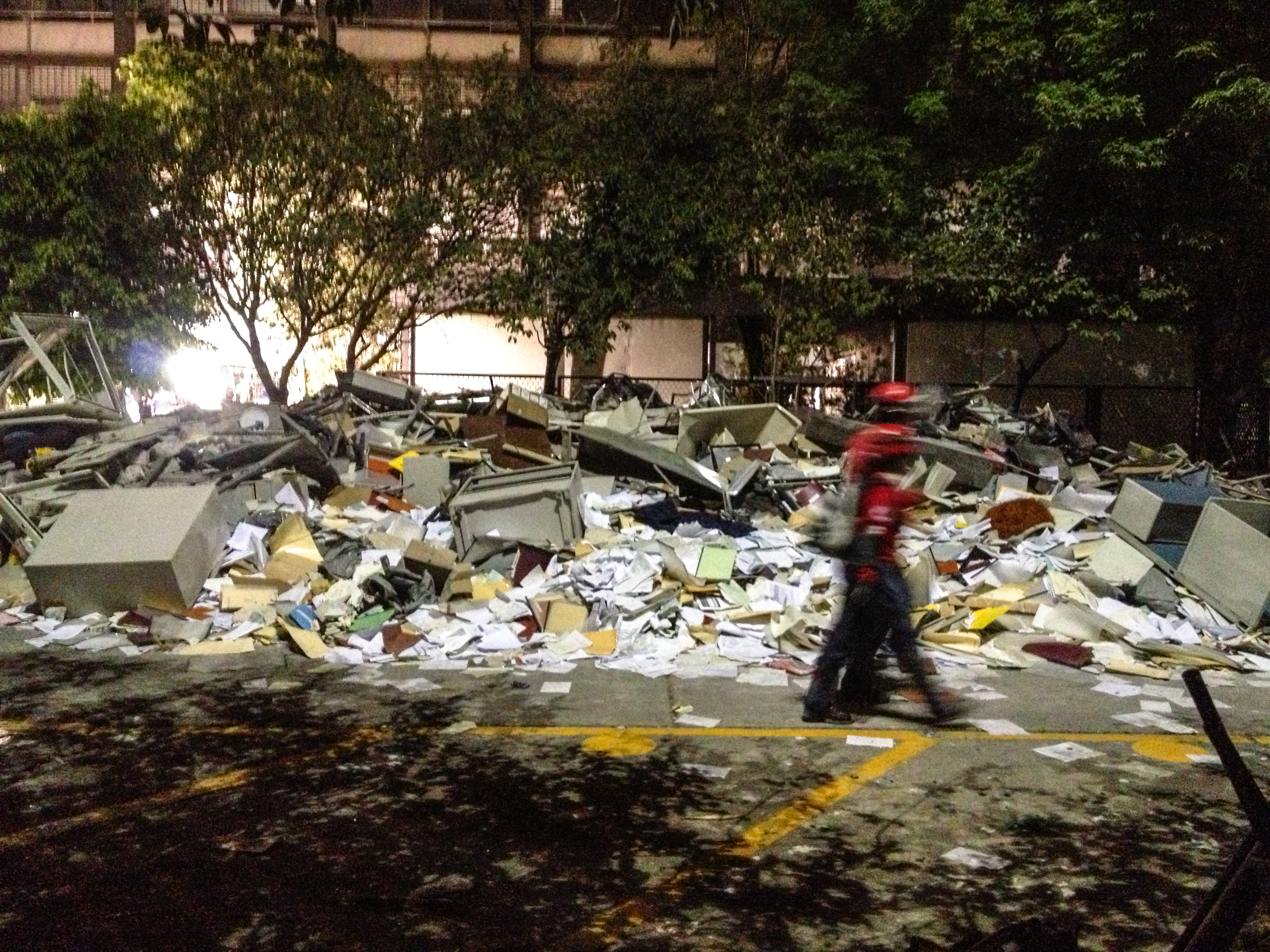
Aftermath of the Torre Ejecutiva Pemex explosion in 2013

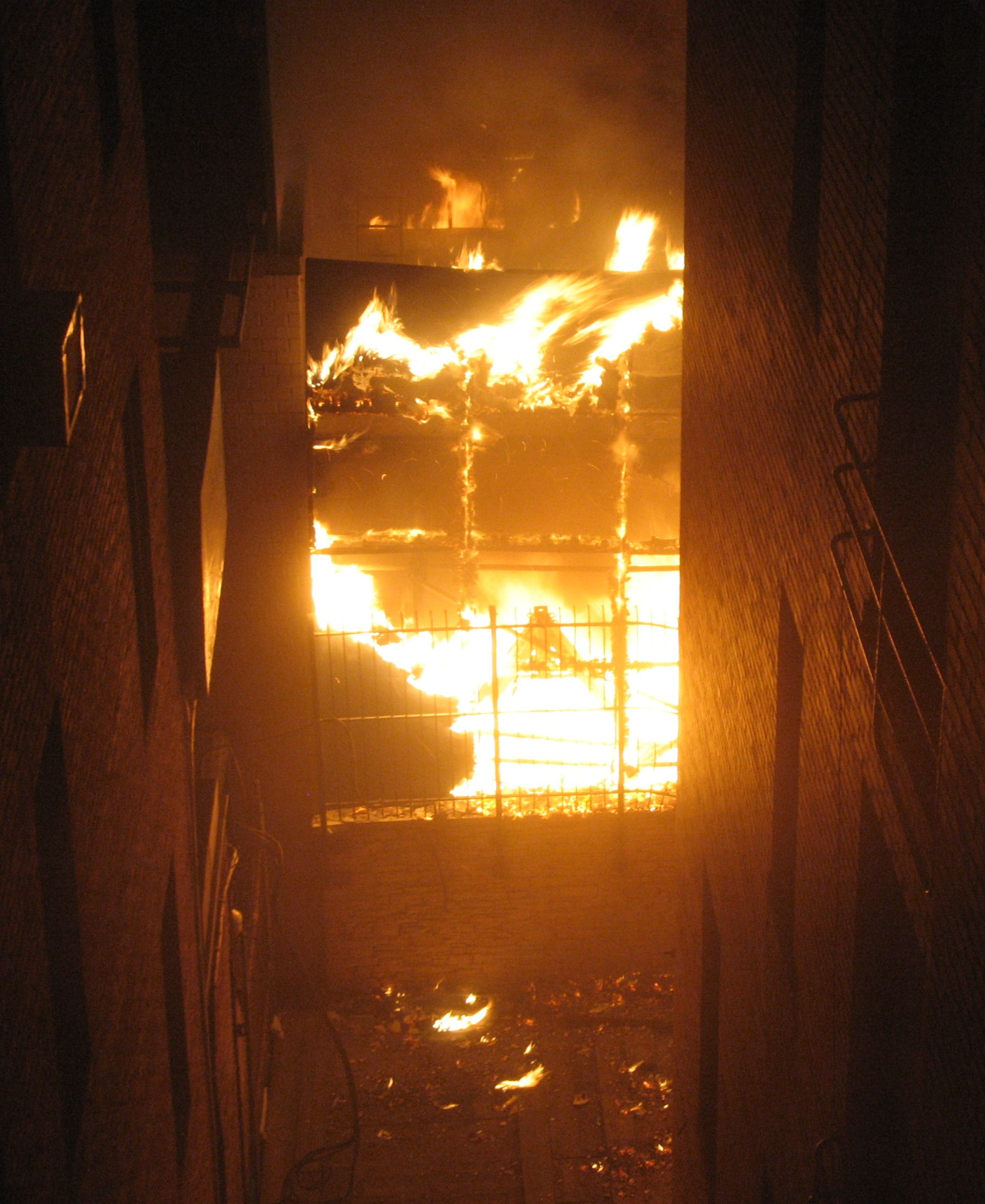
Fire at One57 in 2014

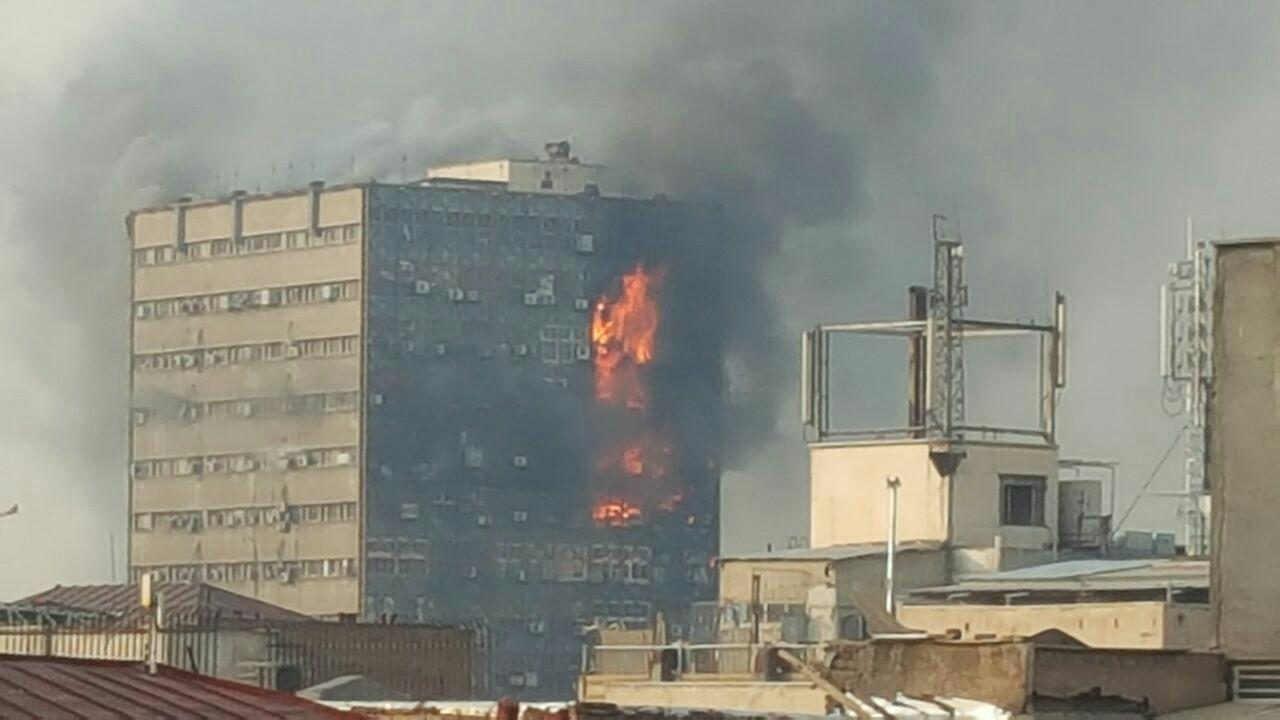
Plasco Building on fire prior to collapse in 2017

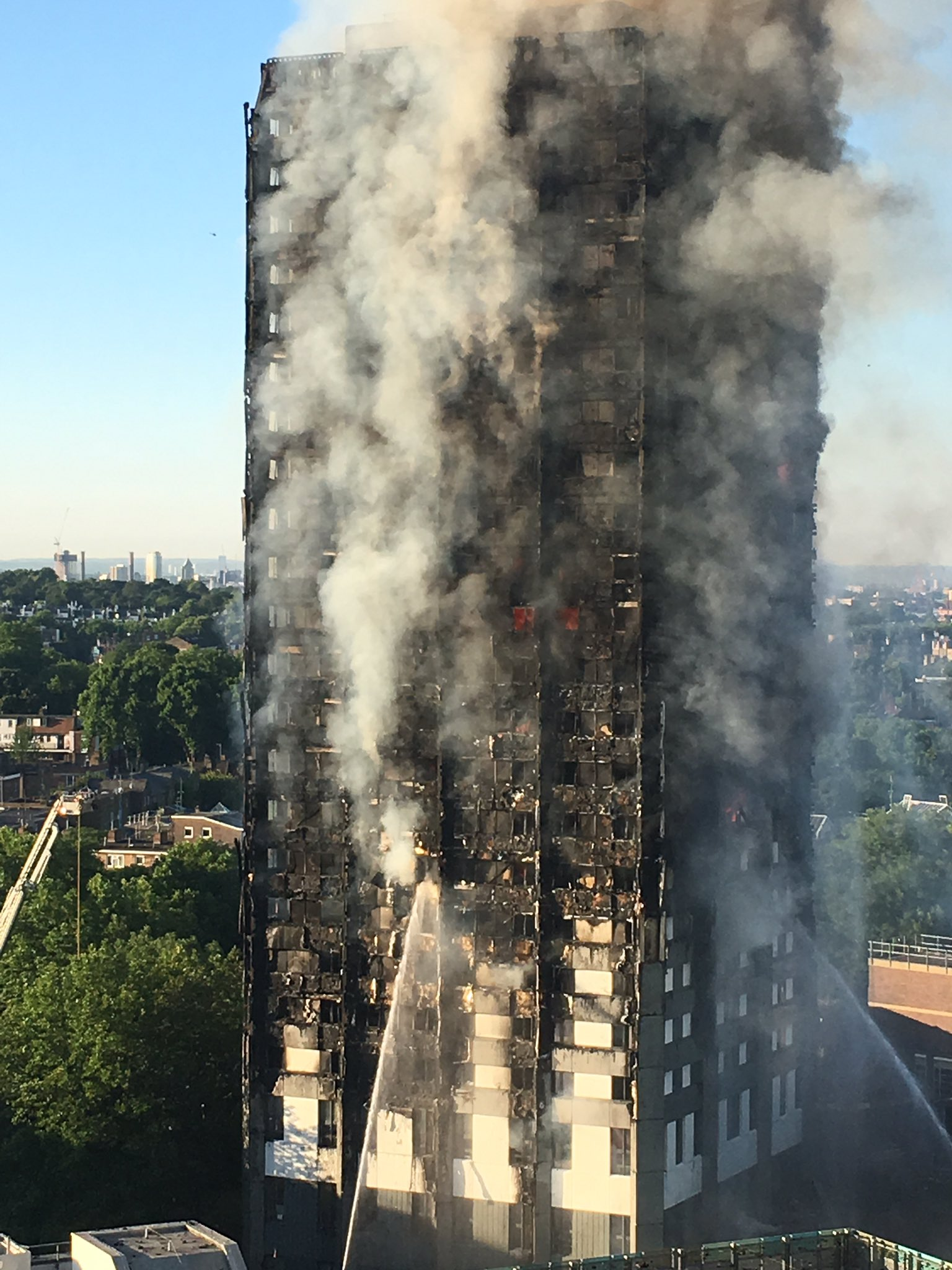
Grenfell Tower in the early morning of 14 June 2017

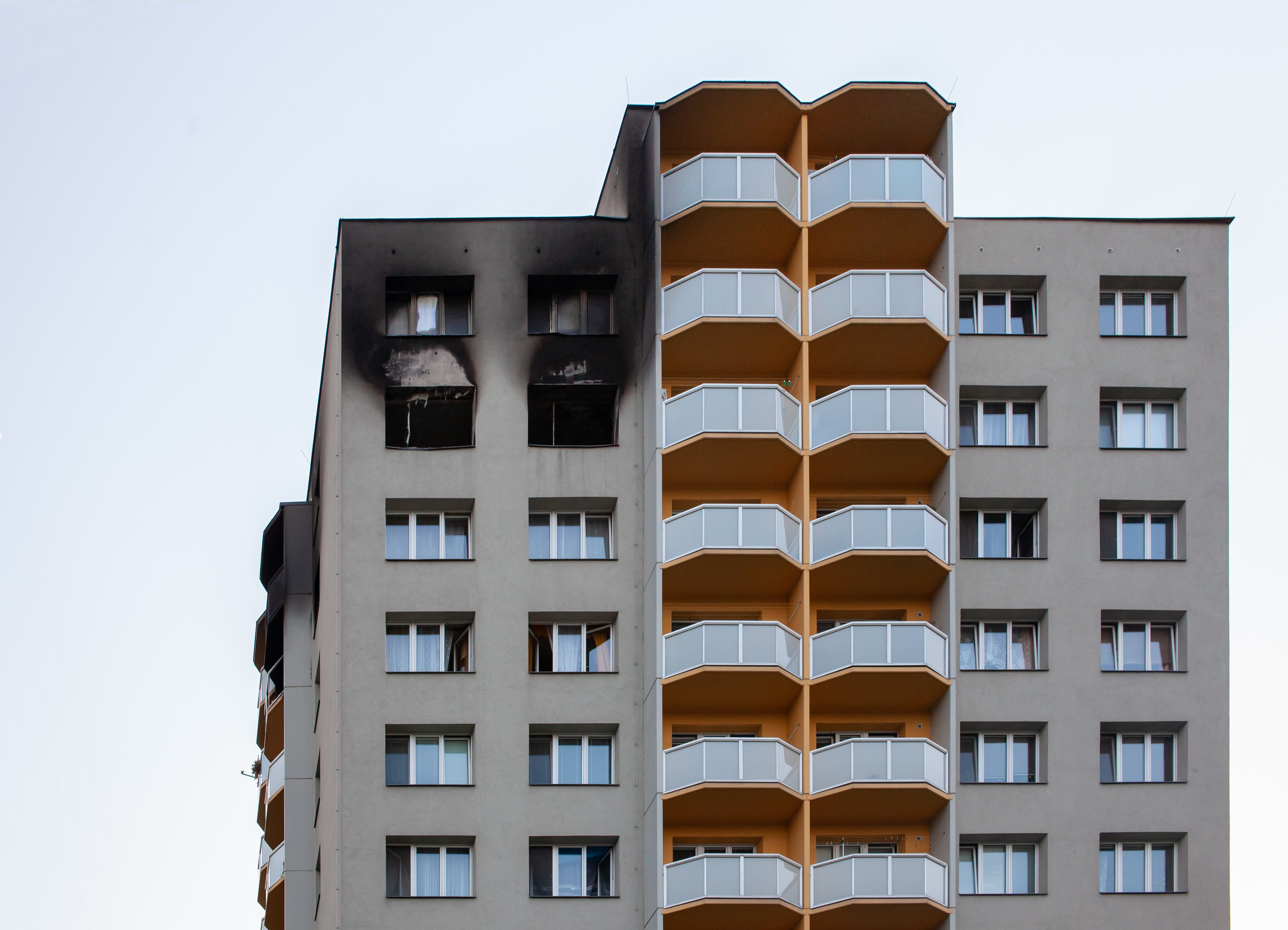
Aftermath of the Bohumín arson attack in 2020

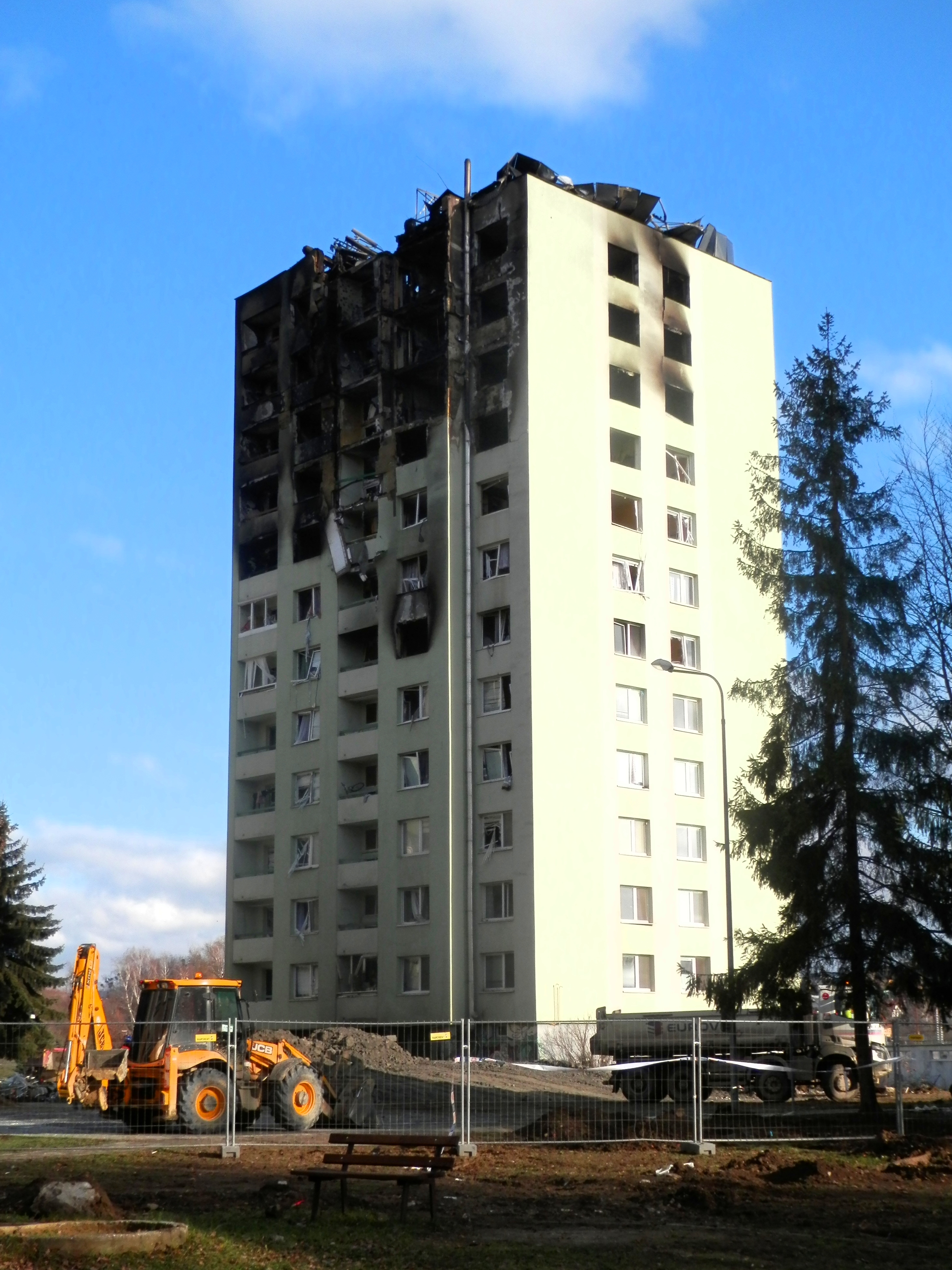
Aftermath of gas explosion in Prešov in 2019

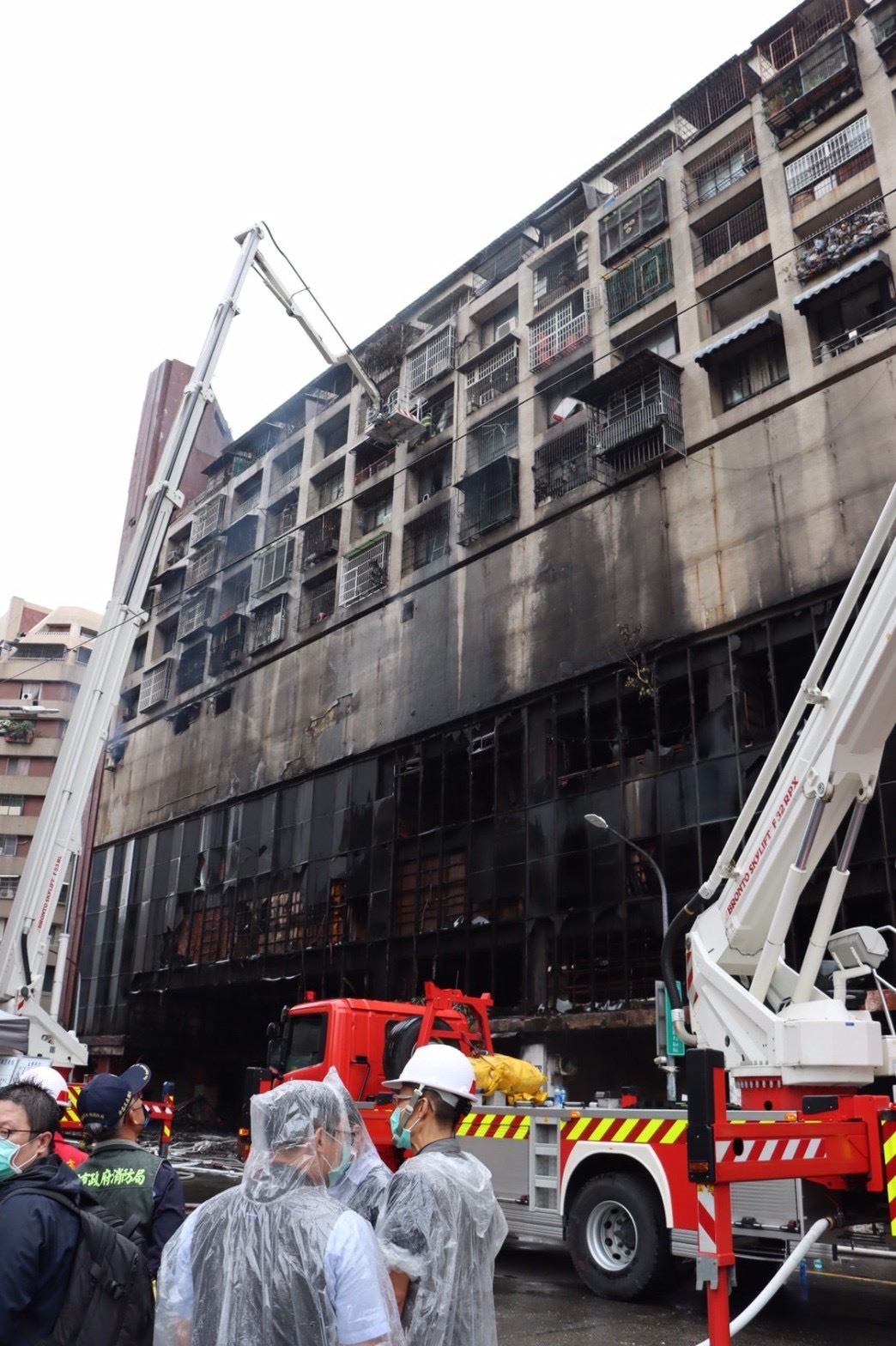
Aftermath of the 2021 Kaohsiung tower fire

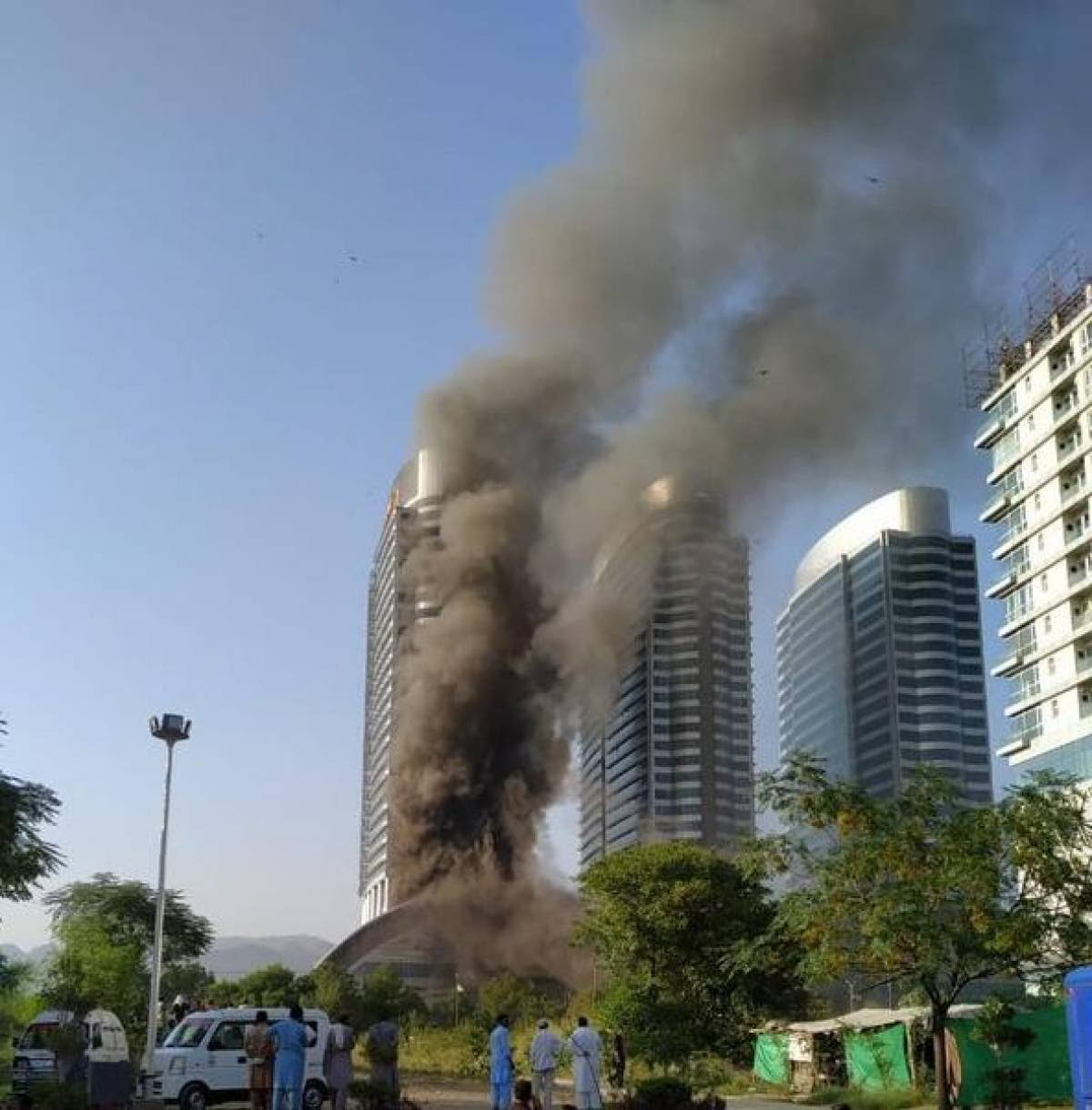
2022 Islamabad building fire

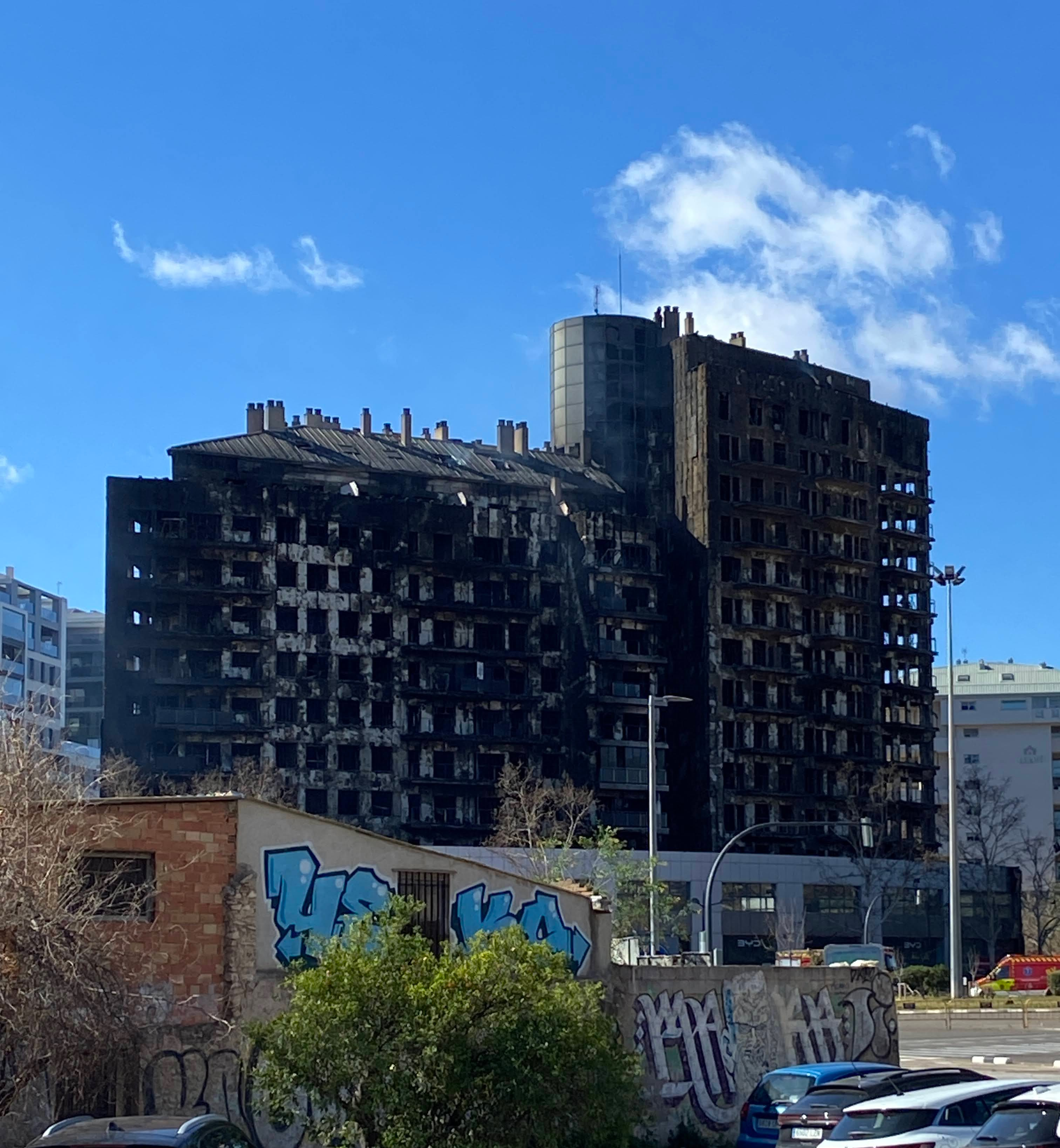
Aftermath of the 2024 València residential complex fire

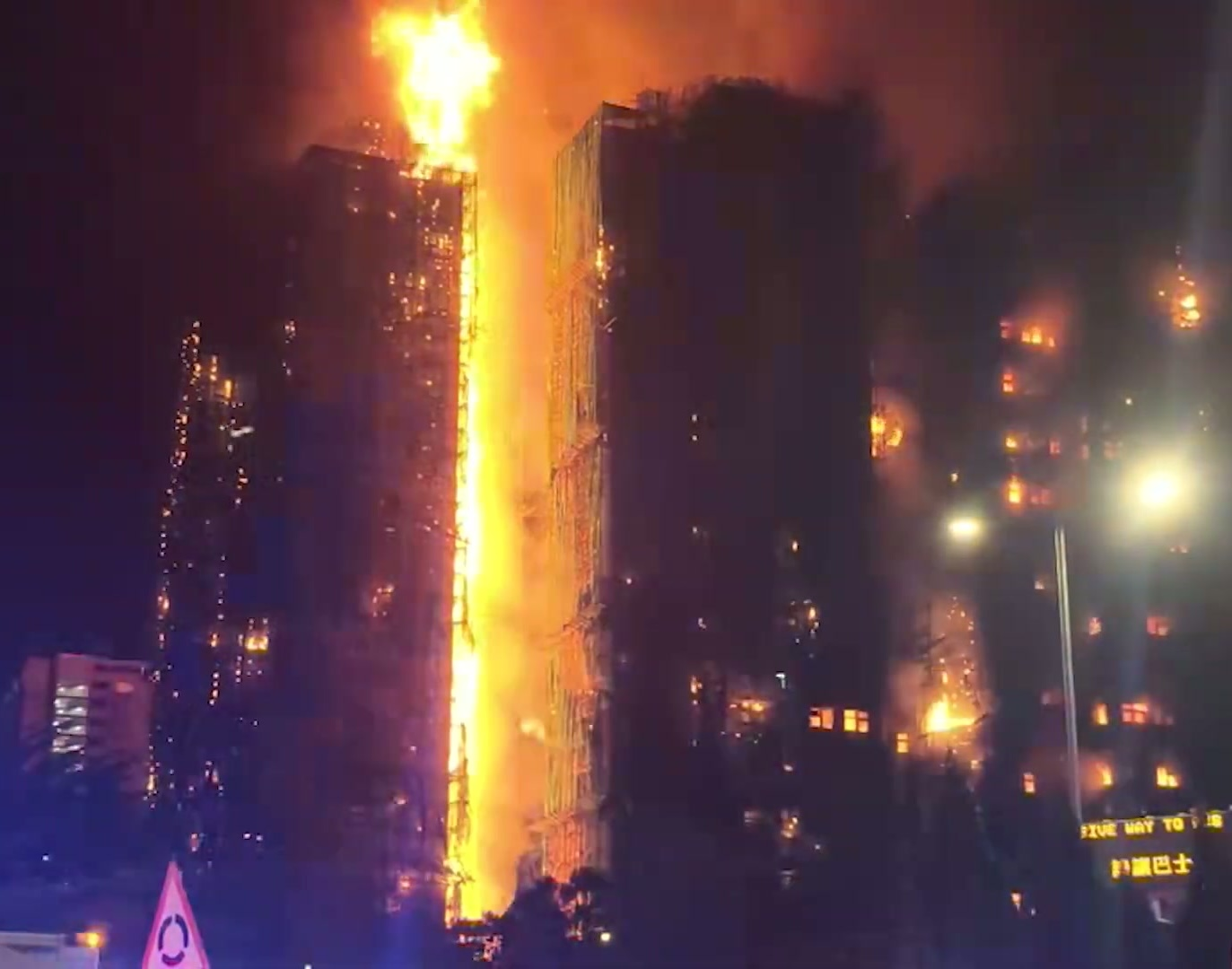
Fire at the Wang Fuk Court in Tai Po, Hong Kong in 2025

== See also ==
- List of building or structure fires
- Skyscraper
- Tower block
- Firefighting
- Fire escape
- List of high-rise facade fires
- The Towering Inferno (film)
