= Torre Ejecutiva Pemex explosion =

2013 gas explosion in Mexico City

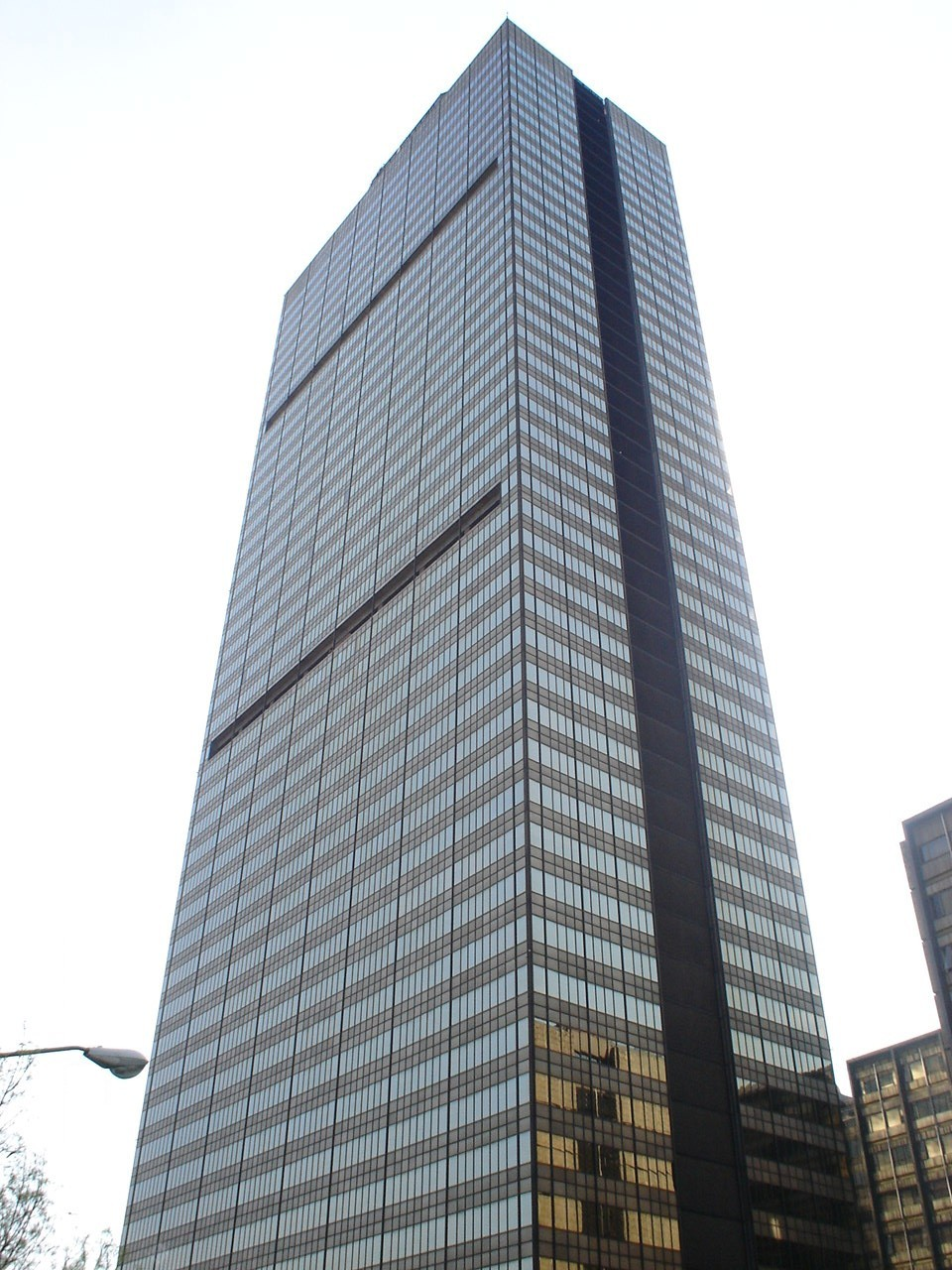
- Headquarters for Pemex in Mexico City
- Date: 31 January 2013
- Time: 15:45 (CST)
- Location: Mexico City, Mexico; 19°26′19″N 99°10′30″W
- Cause: Gas leak, gas explosion
- Deaths: 37
- Injuries: 121

On 31 January 2013 in Mexico City, an explosion caused by a gas leak occurred beneath Building B-2 at the Torre Ejecutiva Pemex (Pemex Executive Tower), a skyscraper complex that is the headquarters of Pemex, the Mexican state oil company. At least 37 people died and another 121 were injured when an explosion occurred in a building adjacent to the main tower. Earlier in the day, Pemex sent out a tweet saying that the building was being evacuated due to a "problem with the electrical system" in the complex that includes the skyscraper.

== Incident ==
At about 3:45 pm local time, an explosion occurred in the basement of a parking garage adjacent to the main office building. The blast caused the first two stories of the 14-floor Building B-2 to partially collapse. The cause of the blast was a gas leak that was ignited by an electrical fault.

== Aftermath ==
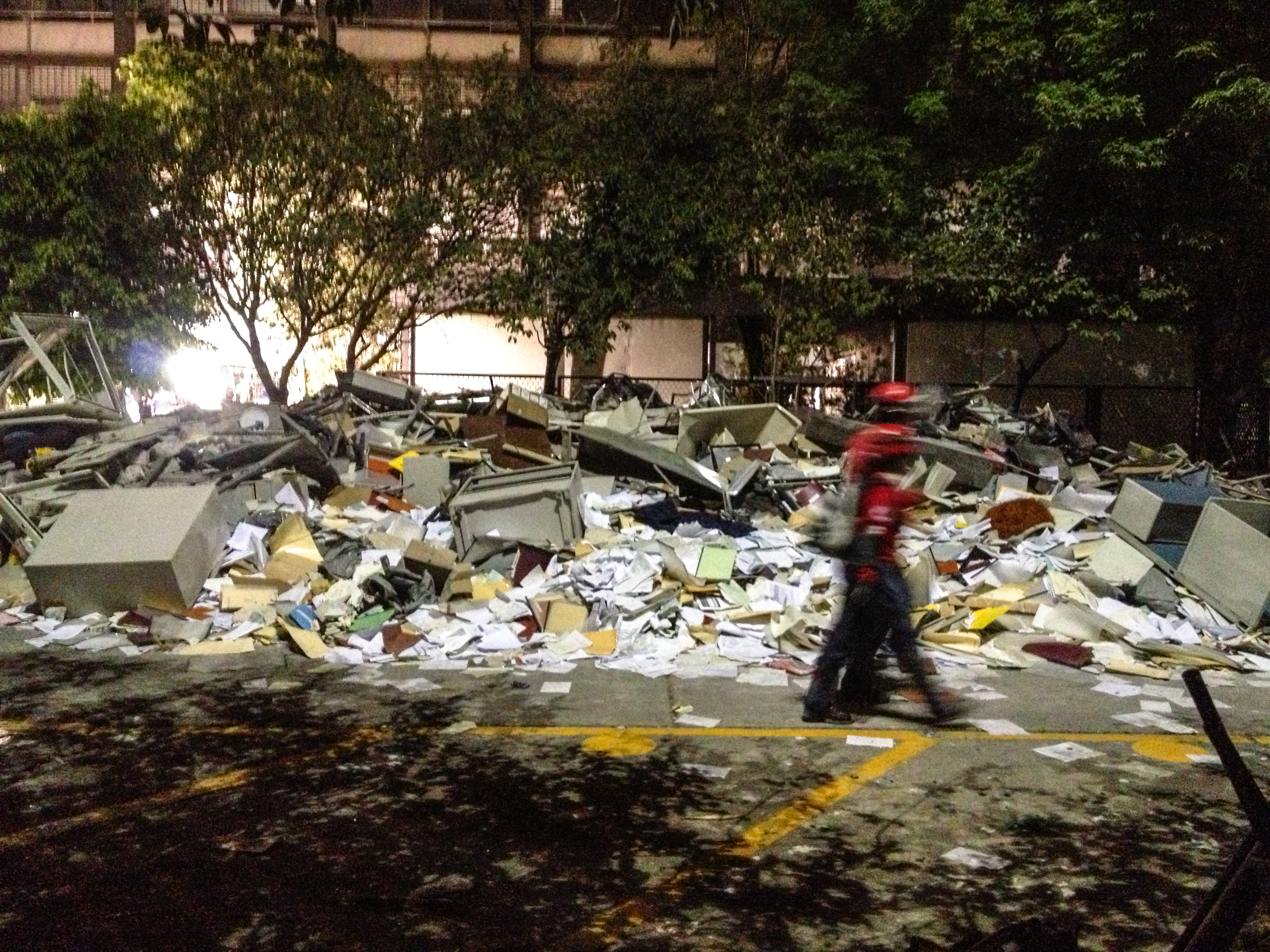
Site after explosion

An evacuation of the area had been begun in the minutes following the explosion. In the hours after the blast, about 30 people were reported to be trapped in debris, and searches continued into the next day, as Pemex CEO Emilio Lozoya said there were indications that some people remained under the rubble.

An initial estimate of casualties, given by a Mexico City government official about two hours after the explosion, was of about five dead and 75 injured. By evening, the Mexican interior minister said that the death toll had risen to fourteen, with 80 injuries. As of 1 February 2013, the death toll stood at 33 and was expected to rise, according to a paramedic at the site. There were 12 men and 20 women who were confirmed to have died, along with 121 people injured, 52 of which remained in the hospital the day after the explosion. By 4 February, the death toll had risen to 37, with three more bodies uncovered and the death of an injured woman.

An estimated 500 rescuers were working at the site through the day on 1 February 2013, including firefighters, military personnel, and Red Cross workers, aided by dogs and a crane. Four helicopters were used to evacuate those injured, in addition to ambulances. While rescue operations were underway, police cordoned off the area around the office complex.

On 4 February 2013, it was announced by Attorney-General Jesus Murillo Karam that the explosion was caused when a buildup of gas in the basement was ignited by a spark, from what was believed to be an electrical fault. According to Murillo, the explosion had expanded outwards, consistent with a gas explosion, rather than remaining focused in one spot, as a bomb would have done, and none of the victims had injuries of the types associated with bombings.

== Reactions ==
Through Twitter, President of Mexico Enrique Peña Nieto wrote: "I have ordered the relevant authorities to implement rescue protocols and the investigation of the facts. The priority right now is to attend to the injured and to safeguard the physical integrity of those who work there". He also sent his condolences to relatives: "I deeply regret the death of fellow PEMEX workers. My condolences to their families". Peña Nieto also established three days of national mourning.

The Director General of Pemex, Emilio Lozoya Austin, tweeted: "My condolences to all the families of workers at Pemex who have lost loved ones in the explosion of today".

Former National Action Party presidential candidate Gustavo Madero Muñoz, the governors of Guerrero, Zacatecas, Veracruz, Morelos, Tabasco, and Oaxaca, and the Finance Minister, Luis Videgaray Caso, and several senators also sent their condolences and expressed solidarity with the families of the victims.

== See also ==
- 1992 Guadalajara explosions
- 2010 Puebla oil pipeline explosion
