= 2005 Paris fires =

Building fires in Paris

In 2005, three major fires occurred in Paris, France, killing 48 people, the majority of whom were Black French with an African background.

== Fires ==
In the early hours of 15 April 2005, a fire broke out at the Paris-Opera, a six-storey, one-star, budget hotel in the 9th arrondissement. Many of the victims were trapped on the building's upper floors, with some jumping from windows in an attempt to escape. Most of the 76 people staying in the hotel at the time were French with an African background with a dual French passport waiting to be housed. The rest were guests of several different nationalities. 24 people were killed and 50 others injured. Around half of the dead were children. On the scene, the nearby Galeries Lafayette department store was used as an emergency hospital and temporary morgue.

On 26 August 2005, 17 French-West African immigrants were killed in a fire at a block of flats in the 13th arrondissement, at least eight of whom were children. District mayor Serge Blisko stated that the deaths had occurred from asphyxiation, not from burns. According to authorities, the fire started in a stairwell in the early hours of 26 August and continued to burn for three hours before it was brought under control by around 210 firefighters. According to one resident, the building, which was in a "decrepit state", was home to about 130 people: 30 adults and 100 children. The resident further said that the building was state-owned and run by Emmaus and France-Euro Habitat.

On 30 August 2005, 7 French-Ivorian immigrants, four of whom were children, were killed in a fire at a block of flats in the Marais.

== Responses ==
Following the 30 August fire, French President Jacques Chirac ordered authorities to undertake an investigation to improve fire safety measures. Interior Minister Nicolas Sarkozy announced that police would close dilapidated buildings in Paris, but did not provide details as to where displaced residents would be housed. French Prime Minister Dominique de Villepin later announced that the government would build 5,000 subsidized apartments, primarily based in unused public buildings, by 2007, and 5,000 emergency shelters by the end of the year.

Following the April fire and continuing into August, immigrant rights groups criticized what they called government complacency in terms of safety for immigrant housing. The fires also drew media attention to the number of immigrant families struggling to find housing in Paris. In September 2005, some Parisian residents staged protests for increased public housing.

== Paris-Opera fire trial ==
Beginning in November 2013, four people were put on trial for charges of involuntary homicide and injury in relation to the 15 April 2005 fire at the Paris-Opera: the hotel's two managers, their son, who worked as the hotel's night-watchman, and his girlfriend.
