= 2024 Valencia residential complex fire =

Fire in Spanish apartment complex

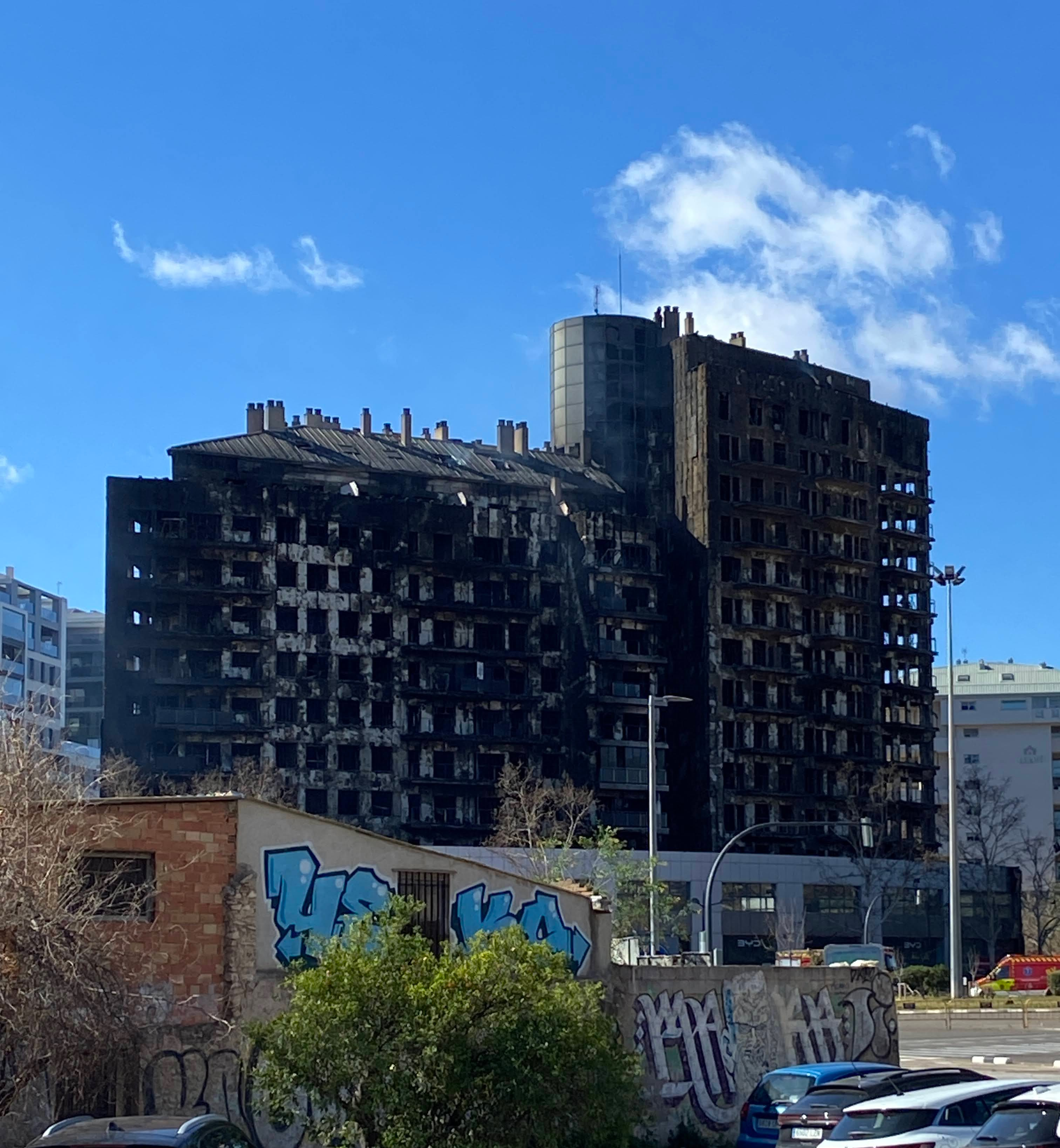
- The complex on the day after the fire
- Date: 22 February 2024
- Location: Valencia, Spain; 39°28′57″N 0°24′8″W
- Type: Structure fire
- Deaths: 10
- Injuries: 15

On 22 February 2024, at approximately 17:30 CET, a fire broke out in a 14-storey luxury residential complex located in the Campanar district of Valencia, Spain. The rapid spread of the fire, exacerbated by strong winds, building materials and a stack effect, led to the complete destruction of the complex's 138 apartments, trapping numerous residents inside.

Ten bodies were recovered from the building following an inspection by forensic police, and 15 people were injured during the blaze, including several firefighters.

== Background ==
The fire occurred in a two-building residential complex with an area of 3,724 square meters (40,080 square feet) at the intersection of Avenida General Avilés and Avenida Maestro Rodrigo in the Campanar neighborhood of Valencia.

Mirroring the circumstances of the 2017 Grenfell Tower fire in London, where polyurethane and aluminium cladding were used, the two-tower complex in Valencia was in initially thought to present a different scenario. Constructed between 2005 and 2009 by the private developer Fbex, which went bankrupt in 2010 due to the Great Recession, the buildings were clad in Alucobond aluminium composite panel. Early reports claimed the insulation used was rock wool, a non-combustible material. However, the investigation eventually found that they were of an older type, consisting of aluminum-polyethylene-aluminum layers. This type of panel, while legal when installed during the 1996-2008 Spanish property bubble, was highly flammable and significantly contributed to the rapid spread of the fire.

Esther Puchades, the vice president of the Valencia College of Industrial and Technical Engineers who had also inspected the building, said that the fire was the first of its kind in Spain.

== Fire ==
Immediately after the fire broke out in what was believed to be a 7th-floor apartment at around 17:30 CET, many lives were saved by the actions of one of the building's concierges (doormen) who banged on the residents' doors shouting "Fire!" and ordered them to evacuate the building. Multiple witnesses nearby captured the early stages of the blaze on their smartphones, showing how it quickly intensified and began spreading across the façade.

Firefighters, ambulances and law enforcement arrived at the scene soon after. Witnesses indicated that the blaze had engulfed the entire first building "in a matter of 10 minutes", and soon spread to the second. Due to the high temperatures firefighters were only able to access up to the 12th floor of the building, but were able to rescue some residents. Winds of around 60 kilometres per hour (37 mph; 32 kn) and gusts of up to 100 kilometres per hour (62 mph; 54 kn) were also recorded in the area at the time. Strong winds fanned the fire and blew water jets away from the building. A father and daughter who were trapped on a balcony were rescued by firefighters using an extendable fire ladder crane. Footage of a firefighter jumping from a seventh floor balcony to a safety mat in order to evacuate was shown in multiple Spanish news outlets.

Because of the magnitude of the disaster, the civilian authorities also requested assistance from the Military Emergencies Unit. About forty fire engines and ninety soldiers were deployed. A field hospital was also set up in the area. During the morning of 23 February the fire brigade was unable to search for missing people inside the apartment complex due to the extreme heat in the building. Drones were utilized by rescue workers to search the building while emergency personnel worked to cool the exterior, in order to locate the bodies of potential victims.

=== Investigation ===
The investigation concluded that the tragedy actually began in an eighth-floor apartment of the 14-story residential complex due to a leak in the refrigerant system of a fridge. The leaking gas, isobutane, is highly flammable and can ignite even at room temperature. While investigators could not conclusively determine the exact cause of ignition, they suggest that static electricity or a small spark could have set off the blaze. The report also acknowledges the possibility of an electrical fault but notes that much of the wiring was destroyed in the fire, making it impossible to confirm.

The fire rapidly intensified when it reached the building’s exterior cladding, which consisted of aluminum composite panels with a polyethylene core, materials known for their flammability but legal when installed. These panels, combined with strong winds, allowed the fire to spread quickly, engulfing the entire building. The temperatures reached over 1,000 degrees Celsius in some areas, as evidenced by the complete destruction of supposedly fire-resistant materials like gypsum walls. At such extreme heat, the aluminum panels melted, dripping and spreading flaming material across the façade, further accelerating the fire’s progression.

Additionally, several fire safety systems, including alarms, sprinklers, and smoke detectors, failed to function properly during the fire. Residents reported that water flow from fire suppression systems was inadequate, which may have been due to power being cut, rendering pressure pumps ineffective. This, combined with the building’s design flaws, including poor evacuation routes, made it difficult for many residents to escape.

== Victims ==
Fifteen people were hospitalized, including six firefighters and a child. By February 24, emergency services had confirmed 10 fatalities, including four members of the same family with two little children, a 14-year-old girl, and an elderly couple. The fatalities were identified as nine Spanish nationals and a Russian citizen.

It was the deadliest fire in Valencia since an arson in 1447 that gutted the city center and claimed 10 lives.

== Aftermath ==
People set up campaigns to collect clothing for the displaced people. Donations of food, clothing and toiletries were made. Taxi drivers offered free transportation to affected families and residents to get to hotels that had been set up as temporary shelters.

== Reactions ==
The president of the Generalitat Valenciana, Carlos Mazón, Valencia mayor María José Catalá, and central government delegate to the Valencian Community Pilar Bernabé expressed dismay over the disaster and asked residents not to go near the area to ensure the work of emergency services. Catalá later declared three days of official mourning because of the fire. A number of events, including the first day of the Valencia Fallas, were canceled as a result.

Prime Minister Pedro Sánchez tweeted he was "shocked by the terrible fire in a building in Valencia" and offered "all the help that is necessary." During the morning of 23 February he visited the disaster area. Leader of the opposition Alberto Núñez Feijóo also expressed "great concern" over the disaster. The Royal Household also issued an official communiqué, in which it stated that King Felipe VI and Queen Letizia "were following the evolution of the fire in Valencia with concern", as well as sending their full support to the emergency services and best wishes for the recovery of the injured. Pope Francis sent a telegram expressing his condolences over the disaster.

A LaLiga match between Valencia and Granada that was due to be held on 24 February at the Mestalla Stadium was postponed following the fire. Valencia CF said they were "devastated" by the fire and would fly flags at half mast at all of their facilities. A match between Levante and Andorra that was also due on 24 February was also postponed due to the fire. The Royal Spanish Football Federation said a minute of silence would be held before the UEFA Women's Nations League semifinal match between Spain and the Netherlands in Seville on 23 February.

Relatives of victims of the Grenfell Tower fire and a similar incident in Milan traveled to Valencia on 29 February to lay flowers for the victims of the building fire. They also met with emergency responders and stated that there were parallels between the previous disasters and the current one.

== See also ==
- Grenfell Tower fire
- Hotel Corona de Aragón fire
- List of building or structure fires
- List of high-rise façade fires
