= The Centaurus =

Real estate development in Islamabad, Pakistan

- سَینٹورس
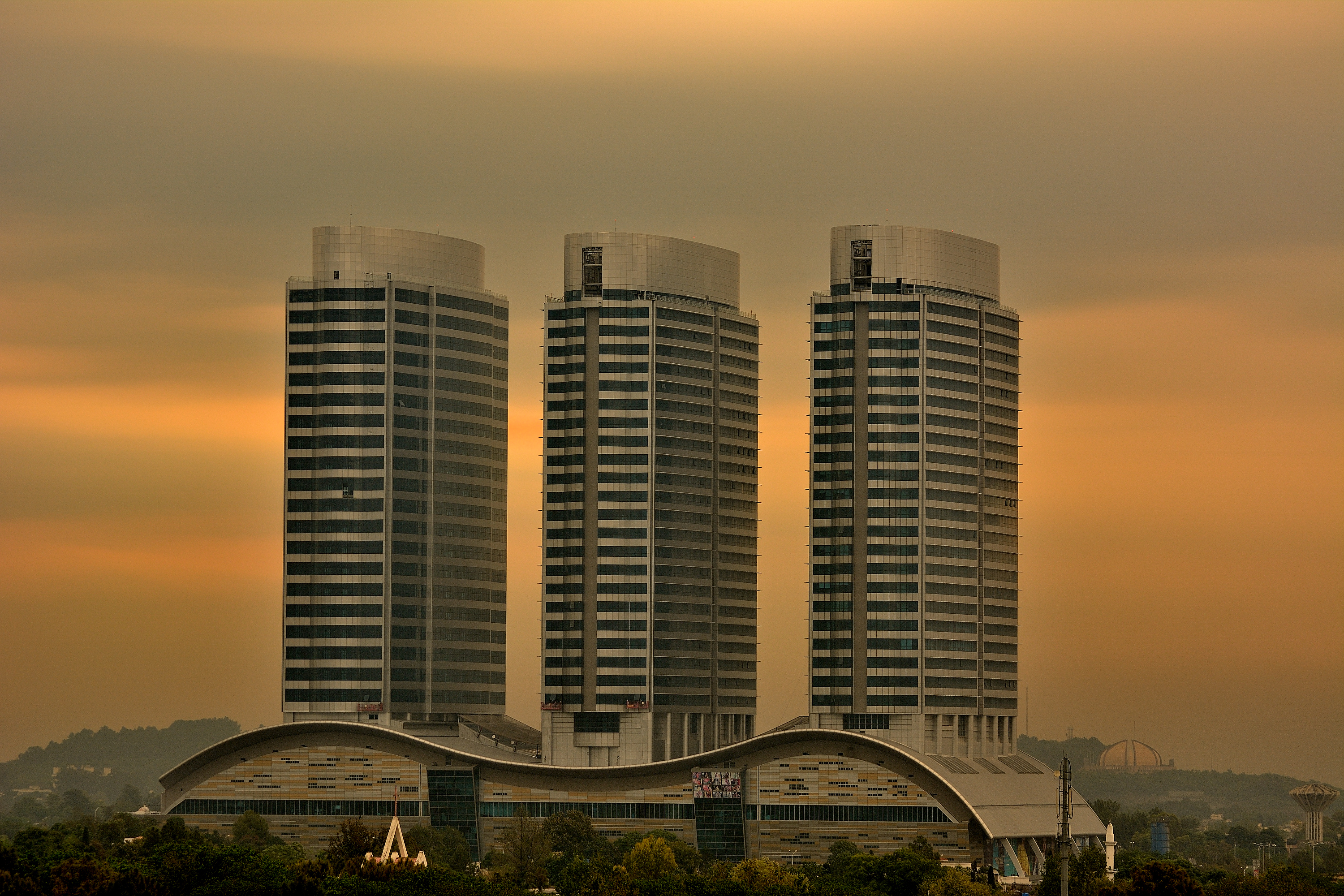
- The Centaurus

General information
- Status: Completed
- Type: Hotel; mall; residential; corporate
- Location: One Jinnah Avenue, Sector F-8, Islamabad-44220, Pakistan
- Coordinates: 33.7077°N 73.0499°E
- Current tenants: Mövenpick Hotels & Resorts
- Construction started: 2006
- Completed: 2015
- Opening: 17 February 2013
- Cost: USD 450 Million
- Owner: Sardar Muhammad Ilyas Khan (Chairman Centaurus Group of Companies); Sardar Rashid Ilyas Khan (President); Sardar Yasir Ilyas (CEO)

Technical details
- Floor count: 26

Design and construction
- Architect: Atkins
- Developer: Pak Gulf Construction (Pvt) Ltd (Pakistan); Al Tamimi Group of Companies (Saudi Arabia); Sardar Builders (Pakistan)

Other information
- Number of rooms: 500
- Public transit: PIMS Metrobus Station

Website
- thecentaurusmall.com

The Centaurus is a mixed-use real estate development in Islamabad, Pakistan. The complex comprises a four-storey shopping mall, three 22-storey towers containing residential and office space, and a 26-storey hotel operated under the Mövenpick brand. The Centaurus Mall opened in 2013, and the Mövenpick Hotel Centaurus Islamabad, featuring approximately 380 rooms and suites with associated leisure and event facilities, officially opened in early 2025 as part of the broader development adjacent to the retail podium. The project integrates retail, hospitality, residential, and commercial functions within a single urban complex.

== Construction ==
Construction of The Centaurus complex in Sector F‑8, Islamabad, began in 2006 as a mixed‑use development project designed by the British architectural firm Atkins and developed by Pak Gulf Construction (Pvt) Ltd, a joint venture between the Al Tamimi Group of Saudi Arabia and Sardar Builders of Pakistan. The construction work was carried out with the involvement of China State Construction Engineering Corporation. The complex consists of a retail podium housing the shopping mall and three high‑rise towers for residential apartments, corporate offices, and future hotel facilities. The Centaurus Mall portion was completed and opened to the public in phases beginning in 2013, featuring more than 250 national and international retail outlets across multiple floors. Architectural design incorporates modern elements with consideration for earthquake‑resistant engineering standards and draws inspiration from the nearby Margalla Hills with its curved roofline and integrated urban planning. While the mall and residential towers were substantially completed in the early 2010s, work on the hotel and other components continued in later years.

== 2022 fire ==
On 9 October 2022, a significant fire broke out at Centaurus Mall in Islamabad, reportedly originating on the third floor near the food court. Smoke and flames spread across multiple levels of the shopping complex and the adjoining residential towers, prompting a large emergency response from fire brigades, rescue teams, and armed forces units. All occupants were safely evacuated, and no deaths or serious injuries were reported. The fire was brought under control after approximately two hours, with assistance from the Pakistan Navy, Pakistan Air Force, and Rescue 1122, among others. Following the incident, the mall and its residential towers were sealed by authorities pending structural safety assessments and further investigation into the cause of the fire. Initial inquiries indicated that combustible materials and deficiencies in fire safety systems may have contributed to the rapid spread of the blaze.

== Entry policy ==
In 2015, Centaurus Mall introduced an entry coupon system for some visitors, intended to manage overcrowding. The coupon could be adjusted against purchases made on the same day. Certain groups were exempt from purchasing the coupon, including women and children under 12, senior citizens, lawmakers, executives, diplomats, foreign visitors, journalists, lawyers, doctors, teachers, and well-known athletes and public figures. The policy attracted public attention and debate at the time, with many voicing their frustration online, calling the policy "elitist" and an "attempt at class policing".

As of May 2024, the mall does not charge a general entry fee.

== See also ==
- List of tallest buildings in Islamabad
