= Lotus Garden China Telecom Building =

Commercial building in Changsha, China

- 荷花园电信大楼
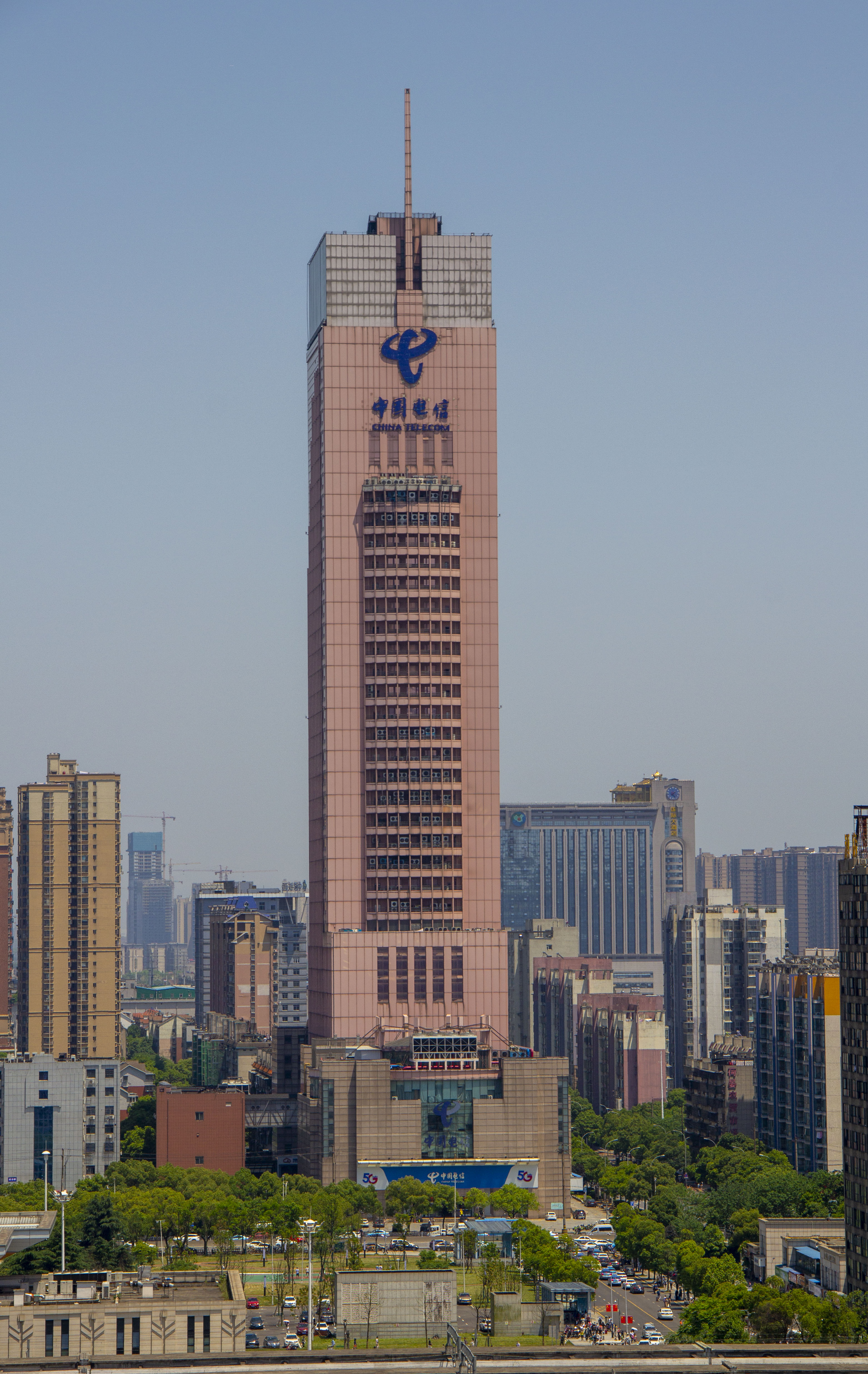
- The building in 2021
- Alternative names: Changsha No. 2 Telecom Hinge Building

General information
- Type: Commercial
- Location: Furong District, Changsha, China
- Completed: 2000
- Destroyed: 2022
- Owner: China Telecom

Height
- Height: 218 m (715 ft)

Technical details
- Floor count: 42

The Lotus Garden China Telecom Building (荷花园电信大楼), also known as the Changsha No. 2 Telecom Hinge Building (长沙第二长途电信枢纽大楼), is a 218-metre-tall (715 ft) commercial building owned by China Telecom in Furong District, Changsha, China. The roof of the building rises to 189 metres (620 ft), with the remaining height being from a spire. Construction began in 1997, and the building was completed in 2000, near a major ring road. At the time of its completion, the building was the tallest high-rise in Changsha.

== 2022 fire ==
On September 16, 2022, the building was engulfed by fire. The fire was first reported at 3:48 PM and was extinguished by 5:00 PM. 36 fire engines and 280 firefighters from 17 stations responded. According to a preliminary investigation, the fire began on an outer wall of the building on one of the lower floors, and quickly spread upwards. Chinese media reported that no casualties were found.
