= Grenfell Tower Inquiry Phase 2 =

Second phase of the public inquiry into the Grenfell Tower fire

Grenfell Tower Inquiry
- Date: 14 September 2017 – 4 September 2024
- Location: London, United Kingdom
- Participants: Sir Martin Moore-Bick (chairman)
- Footage: www.grenfelltowerinquiry.org.uk

The Grenfell Tower Inquiry is a British public inquiry into the Grenfell Tower fire, which killed 72 people and destroyed Grenfell Tower, residential building in the Royal Borough of Kensington and Chelsea, London, on 14 June 2017. It was ordered by Prime Minister Theresa May on the day following the fire.

May announced on 29 June 2017, that the inquiry would be chaired by retired judge Sir Martin Moore-Bick, with the immediate priority "to establish the facts of what happened at Grenfell Tower in order to take the necessary action to prevent a similar tragedy from happening again". She promised that "No stone will be left unturned by this inquiry." On 15 August 2017, the terms of reference of the inquiry were announced. The second phase of the inquiry opened on 27 January 2020 at a new venue in Paddington.

== Phase Two ==
=== Preparation ===
Campaigners had argued that the inquiry should include an advisory panel to assist Moore-Bick. In May 2018, it was announced that two panelists would sit alongside Moore-Bick for the second stage of the inquiry.

There was certain disquiet that phase two would not address the bigger issues of race and class discrimination and the austerity-driven housing crisis believed to have underpinned the disaster. Replacing on the panel, an expert on social housing with an engineer, was seen by Grenfell United and the Hillsborough families support group as evidence that their views were about to be sidelined. “They are not listening and they don't want to listen,” said Nabil Choucair. “The inquiry should be designed to look at the aspects we want them to look at.” Choucair lost six relatives in the fire.

Phase 2 is expected to take 18 months. Two hundred thousand unseen documents, from private emails to phone transcripts and commercial agreements, will be released, illustrating decisions taken by the May government, borough councils, and private companies in the months before the fire, and in the immediate aftermath.

A second allegation of conflict of interest surfaced in January 2020. A few weeks earlier, one of the phase 2 panelists had stepped down and Prime Minister Boris Johnson (who had succeeded May in July 2019) appointed Benita Mehra to fill the post. Mehra was the chair of the Women's Engineering Society charity from 2015 to 2018. The Guardian reported that in 2017 the charity had received a £71,000 grant from the Arconic Foundation, an organisation linked to Arconic, the manufacturer of the panels. Mehra helped draft the application for the grant, which was the largest donation the charity had received that year. Following criticism from opposition politicians and survivors, Mehra expressed regret for her oversight, and resigned on 25 January.

Phase 2 was divided into eight modules:

1. The 2015–16 refurbishment
2. The testing, certification and marketing of the cladding panels and external insulation
3. The management of Grenfell Tower, including how residents' complaints were handled #Central and local government responses to the disaster
4. The response of London Fire Brigade
5. Building regulations and enforcement
6. Remaining expert evidence
7. Remaining evidence from bereaved, survivors and residents

=== Module 1 ===
The second phase of the inquiry opened on 27 January 2020 at a new venue in Paddington, with Arconic's lawyer making a statement.

The second phase opened with statements from lawyers for Studio E, the architects of the refurbishment; Rydon and Harley Facades, the buildings; Celotex, who had made the combustible insulation; and Arconic, who had supplied the ACM panels. There were also statements from the Royal Borough of Kensington and Chelsea (RBKC) and the KCTMO.

Lawyers for Rydon introduced emails that showed that Celotex knew that their combustible insulation product was not safe to use with ACM panels as a suitable fire barrier was not available. They produced internal emails from Arconic from 2011 showing that the fire-rating of their Reynobond PE (polyester filled) panels had dropped to class E from class B and so were "unsuitable for use on building façades" in Europe.

The combustible cladding panels made by Arconic, which contained the flammable polyethylene core, were chosen as part of an attempt to cut £454,000 from the budget by KCTMO. The architect, builders and fire engineer who worked on the refurbishment knew the cladding system would fail in the event of a fire more than two years before the blaze, in conditions where the fire flamed through windows. The lawyers for Celotex introduced an email thread where Daniel Anketell-Jones of Rydon, discusses the need for a fire stop in the cavity and this was copied and discussed by the other organisations involved.

After the companies' opening statements were read, Richard Millett criticised them for failing to admit any mistakes: "With the sole exception of RBKC, not a single core participant involved in the primary refurbishment of Grenfell Tower has felt able to make any unqualified admission against its own interests." RBKC had admitted its building control body had made errors, while Celotex admitted its marketing of the insulation had been misleading. The Times suggested that the companies' response had been to "blame each other." Millett added: "Any member of the public reading these statements and taking them all at face value would be forced to conclude that everyone involved in the refurbishment of Grenfell Tower did what they were supposed to do and nobody made any serious causative mistakes."

=== Suspension ===
On day three and four, witnesses involved in the tower's refurbishment have asked for confirmation that any evidence they give will not be used against them in any criminal proceedings that might take place, before they will give evidence. At the hearing on 6 February, the chairman ruled that the inquiry should be suspended till at least 24 February to allow the attorney general Geoffrey Cox time. He explained to the victims and families that the right not to self-incriminate was enshrined in English law. This is not the same as being given immunity from prosecution. However the suspension dragged on with the Attorney General wishing to ascertain how many witnesses would demanding immunity, and the chairman pointed out this was of the greatest urgency as a health and safety issue affect hundreds of lives.

On 2 March, a further attempt was made to reopen the inquiry. The attorney general had given the assurance, and Moore-Bick explained that the undertaking meant that “no one will be able to justify refusing to answer questions on the grounds that to do so would or might expose him or herself personally to a risk of prosecution”. Community activists protested loudly that “It's one rule for them and one rule for the firefighters,” and “It means the firefighters were hung out to dry. It's a whitewash. It means the inquiry is a whitewash.” Later, Andrzej Kuszell of Studio E, the architects admitted that refurbishing tower blocks was “something that was not within our normal experience”.

=== Resumed evidence ===
This started with evidence, from Studio E. A lot of this was about who knew what, and whether they were qualified to do what they did. On 3 March 2020 the inquiry heard:

- The lead architect had no experience of cladding high rise buildings or polyethylene composite materials.(cladding)
- The Point of contact was not a qualified architect.
- Sounes, the architect said he had “no knowledge” of rapid fire spread and had not read regulatory guidance about how to design the cavity barriers that were intended to stop fire spread and which failed at Grenfell, believing that it was Building Control's job to check his drawings for compliance. He had not heard of Lakanal, or that aluminum cladding could burn.
- An email was produced from Kate Cooney of Exova the fire consultants, four years before the project was signed off, suggesting that there were concerns about the safety of the "ff shaft/MoE" [fire-fighting shaft/Means of Escape, ie the escape stairs and landings and any additional provision for firefighters] making an already unsafe building worse, but they could massage the scheme to mitigate the dangers. Sounes believed that, as building control had signed off the system, it was acceptable. Sounes was taken ill and was not cross-examined further.

==== Week 9 March 2020 ====
Neil Crawford, the lead architect for Studio E, revealed that Studio E had been on the point of terminating Exova in 2012 for failing to adequately scrutinise early proposals, and that a promised report on the safety of the revised cladding never arrived. In Crawford's opinion, Celotex had actively tried to deceive by saying, in an architect's information sheet, that the material was “acceptable for use in buildings above 18m in height” whereas in fact that statement actually referred to a different product. Crawford used the metaphor that 'it was passing off horse meat as beef'.

In the light of the Prime Minister's statement on the afternoon of 16 March 2020, the panel decided on the same day to hold no further hearings for the time being.

=== Resumption – 6 July 2020 ===
Due to the COVID-19 pandemic social distancing rules now in place, not all the members of the public who wished to attend were allowed to do so, but were able to view the proceedings via a video link.

The inquiry heard claims that during the planning process Simon Lawrence, a key executive of Rydon, failed to respond to concerns that the cladding might be dangerous and that it could lead to a repeat of the Lakanal House tower fire in south London in 2009 which caused the death of six people.

Project emails show that Rydon, Exova, and the architects Studio E discussed the fire safety of the cladding before its installation, including warnings it might fail. Tony Pearson, of Exova, told the architects: “If significant flames are ejected from the windows, this would lead to failure of the cladding system, with the external surface falling away and exposing the cavity.”

The inquiry was told that in November 2014, an official at KCTMO asked Simon Lawrence to clarify the “fire retardance of the new cladding” but that Lawrence did not respond.

The inquiry also heard that Studio E manipulated its fees to avoid the contract being put out to open tender.

=== 8 July ===
The inquiry heard the fire engineer, Terry Ashton of Exova, say that his responsibilities on the project had been limited to the reconstruction of the tower, and not on the plans to reclad it. He said he had received an FTP link to a folder of documents from Studio E that contained the drawings and early plans for the recladding, but that he had not accessed the FTP link. He said that an FTP link was sent to various members of the design team. He was copied to the email but this was the standard scattergun approach on projects of this size and he was not specifically asked to look at the documents. He said that he had also not thoroughly read the building guidelines "BR 135 guidance on fire spread in external walls". He said he had never visited the site but despite this that he had written the Fire Strategy document referred to by the design team at Studio E.

=== 13 July ===
Building regulations approval was explored. RBKC had a reputation for sticking to the letter of the regulations. Obtaining building regulations approval is seen as being a process of negotiation. One proposal is put forward and a compromise reached. RBKC were adamant that the new wall structure must include fire stopping barriers with a two-hour rating. Studio E architects found this unnecessary claiming the job was done by the cavity barriers.

=== Monday 20 July ===
Chris Holt, Rydon's site manager attested: “I was aware that as the refurbishment was to a residential block of flats, one of the main risk factors would be fire safety. When I started on the project I spoke to Simon Lawrence (Rydon) and asked whether I was required to consider aspects of fire safety in my role. Simon informed me that it was not part of my role and had been dealt with.” Rydon did not normally employ specialist fire consultants and felt “comfortable with the risk”, as it had done before on social housing blocks: they believed they were using competent specialist sub-contractor. Rydon had assured RBKC and the architect that they were employing a fire expert in meetings in April, June, July, September and October 2014. Thus the cladding material had been chosen without consulting a professional. Lawrence confirmed this.

Simon Lawrence, an executive of Rydon, the principal contractor was testifying. He explained he knew that RBKC was attempting to save £800,000 on the job and to win the contract offered to save £293,368 by switching from the originally specified zinc cladding to the plastic-filled aluminium panels. The bid was accepted. Lawrence was not aware of the increased danger and hadn't researched it. However, the saving was £419,627, but this was never mentioned to the client. Rydon itself had undercosted the job and was trying to make up a £212,000 shortfall.

=== 21 July ===
David Gibson, head of capital investment from KCTMO [landlord] recalls making a spelling correction to the minutes on a meeting with Rydon in early 2015. Those minutes cannot be found. He recalls raising the panel safety issue with Lawrence who said the plastic-filled panels were inert. Lawrence denies having said so. There were discussions on the optimum fixing system, KCTMO held out for the more expensive "cassette-fix" which gave a smoother finish while Lawrence tried to persuade them to save £75,000 by using the 'face-fix' method.

=== 22 July ===
The inquiry began to examine the contractor's on-site behaviour. It heard that the contractors referred to the residents who criticised their workmanship as rebels and aggressive rebels. There were claims that the residents had threatened the contractors, who were using inappropriate behaviour and language on site. In an email, Lawrence of Rydon admitted that the site was “poorly performing” and they were using “cheap incompetent sub-contractors”. Reed of KCTMO found Rydon complacent. Rydon had given the job of packing the window gaps with fire-resistant Rockwool to a former employee's company, and was not aware they had substituted cheaper flammable material. KCTMO was aware that the Residents Association was dissatisfied with the work, and that one of their number had predicted the effects of the fire 14 months previously. He was labelled as aggressive. The contractors didn't clean up after the job and accused the residents of having made the mess. Lawrence in a contemporary email said there were missing finishes and gaps and he thought it was “a disaster”. He was not aware that there were window lining regulations he should adhere to.

=== 21 September ===
Evidence was given by the project manager Ben Bailey, 23 at the time, the son of the owner of Harley who were sub-contracting for Rydon. Celotex RS5000 came on the market as he was sourcing materials, He was not aware that changing materials for the project required consent from Rydon which had not been obtained. He said the only assessment of its performance that he saw was of its thermal insulation, not its fire performance – he was not aware that it was his job to check that. He obtained a 43% discount as Celotex wished to use the tower as a case study. Celotex only guaranteed the safety of the insulation in the configuration they had tested and not for use with flammable plastic-filled aluminium panels. That caveat was missed by Bailey. Bailey said that had no training in understanding building regulations or in keeping up-to-date with industry codes of practice for the design and installation of cladding and windows. He said it was never his role to be considering the fire performance of the materials."

=== 29 September ===
John Rowan & Partners supplied two clerks of works to the project, one as a mechanical and electrical systems clerk of works, Tony Batty, and a general building clerk of works, Jonathan White. They were not employed to fulfil an end to end role but to act as part time consultants. Rydon had a design and build contract and was responsible for the quality of its finished work. The John Rowan clerks of works were there to provide site monitoring and supervision services.

The inquiry took evidence from Mark Dixon of SB Plastering on the window reveals. The window reveal is the surround of a glazing unit perpendicular to the glass. The glazing unit creates an interior reveal, and an exterior reveal, the top is known as the head, the bottom is the sill and the sides are called the jambs. In the job, the window was moved outward and reduced in size. Dixon understood that his role was to create new interior reveals- in effect a purely cosmetic job. He agreed with Rydon to use rigid insulation board (flammable UPVC). He had not consulted building regs or confirmed the plan with the architects. He assumed that others would have checked.

John Hoban, senior building control surveyor at RBKC, reported councillors had signed off substantial cuts to the building control department. It was “swamped” with work as austerity-driven cuts slashed the staff numbers. The key surveyor was left handling 130 projects. He was assigned Grenfell Tower, which should have been handled by a senior officer. He had never worked before on highrise overcladding of a block. He had resigned before the fire because he had “had enough" and it wasn't the job he trained to do.

The council-owned tenant management organisation, the architect, main contractor and cladding contractor assumed the council's building control department was ensuring that refurbishment did comply with the building regulations. Hogan was unaware of that, or about a series of fire risks embedded in what was designed and built.

Hoban had received no training or technical industry guidance and said reading professional magazines was considered as their continuing professional development. He had not read the document about the fire performance of external thermal insulation for walls of multi-storey buildings known as BR135. It detailed a 1999 cladding fire in Garnock Court in Irvine, Scotland, and explained with pictures the rapid fire spread through cladding, and he was not aware of the guidance differentiating between non-combustible panels made from materials such as cement and combustible panels, including aluminium panels which may melt and create molten debris.

Hoban had made handwritten notes and handwritten project sheets and remembered putting all his notes into the Acolaid system, including coming in at the weekend to do so. These were now all missing.

Hoban identified two problems that afflicted his department and had led to the fire safety aspects of the cladding being missed. These were the austerity cuts between 2013 and 2017, that had led to ten experienced officers being replaced by one graduate trainee, and the stripping back of building regulations and enforcement byelaws together with a weaker building act. He said, “If we had a regulatory body like we had with the Greater London Council and the regulations and building act and bylaws we had at the time, and a support network of experts that administered the regulations, I don't think we would be here. ...”.

=== 6 October ===
The owners of the block, RBKC had delegated all responsibility for maintenance to the TMO, the landlord, so deny any responsibility for the disaster. The TMO claim that their choice of contractors for the refurbishment, decided by competitive tender, was blocked as RBKC had underpriced the job, and it would be significantly over budget. The objectives changed as price became more important than quality. Rydon were selected. The landlord rejected a £30,000 offer to inspect the exterior of the tower for building regs compliance - doing it itself to save money.

=== 16 October ===
The first contractor appointed reported that it could not do the job for the amount tendered and it would require a further £1.5 million. The second contractor appointed was Rydon. Rydon's refurbishment manager, Stephen Blake, and Peter Maddison, the TMO's director of assets, had a longstanding professional relationship. At an un-minuted meeting in March 2014, before they were appointed, Rydon agreed with TMO how a further £800,000 could be shaved off a contract awarded to them in a value engineering exercise, in spite of the TMO's lawyers warning that renegotiation prior to appointment was contrary to EU tendering law, and if discovered by the other tenderers could void the contract. Rydon was then given the contract. Maddison revealed that he still had his diaries and notebooks for the period, these were presented to the court, and transcribed. He had been told to hold on to them earlier, but had never previously been asked to hand them over.

=== 26 October ===
Madison, of the TMO, explained the process used in these contracts and how he had delivered the project on budget, a sign that the contract had been correctly priced. He was not aware that the panels were flammable. A further 50% reduction had been extracted from the manufacturer, and Rydon had reduced its price by a further £800 000.

Claire Williams, who worked for Grenfell landlords the Kensington and Chelsea Tenant Management Organisation (TMO), left her job a year after Grenfell. She said she had cleared her desk, destroying earlier notebooks. She did not think anything important could have been lost as the important points had been recorded in the official minutes.

=== Module 2 ===
On 5 Nov 2020, the inquiry started to examine the manufacturing, safety, testing and marketing of the cladding products. Barristers for the victims, in their opening statements repeated the charges that:

- Arconic, which made the cladding sheets that were the main cause of the fire's spread, obtained a certificate for its plastic-filled panels on “a false premise” by supplying test reports for a more fire-retardant version of the product.
- Celotex, which made the bulk of the combustible foam insulation used, displayed a “widespread culture … of ignoring compliance”, which included distorting a full-scale fire test of its materials. A former Celotex manager who had been involved agreed that the company's actions were "deliberately misleading and dishonest", saying he had been made to "lie for commercial gain" with the approval of Celotex's senior executives.
- Kingspan, which made the rest of the insulation, carried out tests that involved either “concealing components in a manner designed to facilitate a pass and/or using materials that were not as described in the test reports,”

It was claimed by the barristers that the companies viewed the safety certificates as marketing tools and of little other importance. A research paper by Saint-Gobain, the parent company of Celotex, said adding fire retardant to the test samples was done “in order to pass unrealistic fire safety tests”. Stephanie Barwise QC explained that this demonstrated that “Each of the[se] manufacturers fully appreciated the inherent flammability of their products and unsuitability for use over 18 metres, as was illustrated by events.”

Evidence was produced that the three manufacturers were aware of the deficiency of their product and worried about preventing these facts damaging their marketing and sales.

On 11 November 2020, it was revealed in a conflict of interest statement, that subsequent to the fire, the Ministry of Housing, Communities and Local Government (MHCLG) is awarding a £600,000 research grant to a consortium whose members include a fire testing specialist Eric Guillaume, whose research was funded by Kingspan, and José Torero, a fire engineer who has publicly opposed outright bans on combustible materials. A rival consortium for the grant, with stronger credentials in the field of smoke installation and toxicity was not appointed. There was no open competitive tender as the contract was let through the Crown Commercial Service system.

On 16 November, Jonathan Roper, a former assistant product manager for Celotex, who worked on two fire tests of the foam panels and the subsequent sales plans, said the company behaved in a “completely unethical” way. When the first test failed, they re-tested inserting additional fire retardant panels.

A senior technician, Ivor Meredith, responsible for safety tests on combustible insulation used on Grenfell Tower, had “a serious drug habit” and fell asleep at work. He had used drugs since 2010. Kingspan, his employer, knew but the problem was “brushed off” until he was sacked in 2015. Meredith helped his employer sell its K-15 Kooltherm phenolic foam insulation, writing letters to clients saying it was suitable for use on high-rise buildings. After Celotex, which they also knew was selling a flammable product, came onto the market competing against their own K12, he managed the testing and certification.

On 30 November 2020, the inquiry learned that Kingspan director Philip Heath had said, in 2008, that consultants who raised concerns about the combustibility of its product could "go f*ck themselves", and that they were "getting me confused with someone who gives a dam [sic]".

==== "WTF" ====
A Celotex executive, Deborah Berger, says she was shocked by firm's approach to test three years before blaze and wrote the acronym WTF in the margin of the test report in 2014 when she discovered that the fire safety tests had been rigged. The modifications were not included in the marketing literature relied on by architects. A photograph of the test rig showed the inclusion of fire-resistant magnesium oxide panels. She reported her concerns to her line manager but later, still uncomfortable, helped word the documentation that was submitted to the Building Research Establishment for product approval. The photograph showing the fire-resistant materials was later removed under pressure from Celotex.

==== Analysis ====
In an opinion piece written for The Guardian, Karim Mussilhy of the Grenfell Survivors Group, commented. " the fire at Grenfell Tower was no accident – it was the result of years of neglect, deregulation and corporate greed." He complained about the scale of the dishonesty and the silence in much of the national media and at the top of government. The materials are on thousands of homes, schools and hospitals across the country. While homes that cannot be sold are wrapped in flammable materials, Celotex, Kingspan, Arconic and BRE still operate as if nothing happened. No arrests have been made and some key Arconic executives are even refusing to attend the inquiry.

He reminded them that Celotex and Kingspan made and sold the insulation and Arconic made and sold the cladding. From the evidence given to the inquiry, Celotex and Kingspan “abused” the fire safety testing regimes and Arconic acted similarly. The privatised Building Research Establishment did not pick this up which question their other judgements.

==== Share options ====
Three of the Kingspan directors had been awarded shares as part of a 2018 bonus package. Predicting a share fall when the truth was revealed, they traded in these shares in September and October 2020. Gene Murtagh, who manufactured the panels, made a £3.1M profit, followed by the executive directors, Gilbert McCarthy and Peter Wilson made £1.8M and £1.6M respectively.

==== December 2020 ====
On 8 December 2020, the inquiry saw evidence that in November 2016, Kingspan technical staff had acknowledged internally that Kingspan was selling its Kooltherm K15 foam insulation product as less flammable than it really was. A version of K15 had correctly tested safe in 2005, but Kingspan had changed the formula for a more flammable foam; marketing it on the old safety certificate. Kooltherm K15 was present in the cladding that caught fire.

On 9 December 2020, the inquiry learned that after the Grenfell fire, Kingspan had invested in a smear campaign against rival companies' products. The campaign involved secretly using non-standard test rigs to artificially create the appearance that non-flammable rival products might in fact be flammable, and hiring lobbyists to push the results before policymakers such as the Housing, Communities and Local Government Committee and other MPs.

Three key witnesses have refused to testify, and are hiding in France, citing a legitimate 51 year old French blocking statute as an excuse for refusing to attend the inquiry. They were employees of Arconic. On Monday 14 December, Grenfell United delivered a letter appealing to the French Ambassador, Catherine Colonna, to exert moral pressure. A van displaying a red white and blue tri-colour poster drove past the French embassy in Knightsbridge. The white panel was replaced by the emotive image of the burnt-out tower.

During the adjournment, Peter Wilson, managing director of Kingspan's insulation boards division and director of the plc announced he was stepping down, and Gene Murtagh, the chief executive, told staff the company was trying to ensure “weaknesses in our testing and marketing of K15 can never be repeated”.

==== February 2021 ====
Debbie French, a former sales executive at Arconic who had sold the panels to Grenfell, explained that Arconic also sold a fire retardant version of the panel, but the default version of the panel, which was cheaper, was highly flammable. The British preferred to use the cheaper panel, so that was the one offered. Claude Wehrle (Arconic's technical manager), Peter Froehlich, and Gwenaëllfe Derrendinger are not cooperating with the inquiry, claiming to be covered by French law. It is alleged the Wehrle had instructed French about which technical details she was allowed to release to customers.

French explained that there had been other high rise fires involving these panels, and discussions had taken place on whether the product should be withdrawn, but the profit margin was far higher on the flammable Grenville style panels so no action was taken.

Vince Meakins, the UK sales manager in 2015 as the refurbishment was nearing completion, explained that, until the fire, there was nothing said to him about not selling the PE product. He had not seen, or known about the email circulating in France from Alain Flacon in May 2016 instructing all employees not to sell it, and to ask their managers for the information needed to persuade clients to change the specifications of existing orders.

Claude Schmidt, Arconic SAS's French president, spoke of the two versions of the Reynobond PE (poly ethylene) panel, the riveted version and the cassette version, and that the regulatory document issued by the British Board of Agrément (BBA) in 2008 did not distinguish between the two types of Reynobond panel. The test in 2004 showed that the cassette version gave off seven times more heat. That was written off as a rogue result, and no further tests were made to discover more. Claude Wehrle, Arconic's technical manager, had said in his written statement the failed test for cassette panels was “not seen as a key issue or priority”. Under cross-examination, Schmidt confirmed that Arconic should have informed the BBA about the test.

==== 22 February 2021 ====
Claude Schmidt, the most senior Arconic executive who had agreed to attend, was back in the witness box. The issue being investigated was: why the firm kept selling the plastic-filled panels after the 2012 fire at the Tamweel Tower in Dubai that had sent “fireballs” to the ground, and why they did not warn customers of possible risks.

There had been an annotated internal email from Wehrle, with a press report of the fire involving a rival's similar product. It was titled “Cladding blamed in skyscraper fire – sounds like something our customers make”. It was noted that “all PE composites react in the same way”. A rival Alcobond announced that it withdrew all PE panels from sale after Tamweel and another UAE fire in 2013. Schmidt doubted the veracity of that statement.

Schmidt continued to sell the PE panels and did not issue a warning to his customers as he believed it to be superfluous, as everyone knew PE was flammable – and he was not aware that his competitors were about to. With ten years hindsight, issuing a warning would now seem to have been the correct action.

In 2014, a test had shown one of his PE products to have fire rated at E, but the Grenfell PE product was marketed as a B (from a 2005 test). Schmidt had not been aware of the test, and thought that not notifying the British Board of Agrément was a serious misleading oversight but not intentional.

The other issue investigated was the role of the American parent company, what they knew and when and whether they chose 'inaction'. In June 2015, the US company's French subsidiary produced an assessment of the safety of the cladding panels at the request of Diana Perreiah, president of Arconic's global building and construction systems business, which said the polyethylene-filled aluminium panels were “flammable”. They were limited by smoke production and flaming droplets” and could only be used on buildings up to 12 metres. Furthermore, Wehrle had emailed colleagues that “PE is DANGEROUS on facades, and everything should be transferred to FR [fire retardant] as a matter of urgency.”

==== Norwegian seminar and three empty chairs ====
The inquiry continued on 10 March 2021, with three empty chairs. Millet, the Counsel to the inquiry, continued to present the evidence he would have used if the Arconic executives had attended. In doing so, he told the court that in 2007, Gerard Sontag (the Arconic executive) attended a seminar by a cladding expert, who had predicted that if a “building made out of polyethylene (PE) core” cladding were to catch fire, would kill “60 to 70 persons”. Sontag reported back to the company that Arconic should consider only selling panels with a fire retardant (FR) core.

In June 2011, Arconic warned a Spanish customer not to use its PE panels because they had fire performance rating E, then in 2014, Arconic sold the PE panels to the Grenfell project explaining they had UK B rated fire performance certificate.

Wehrle, who refused to participate, had shared technical reports from 2015 about 10 high-rise fires in different parts of the world using similar cladding panels, warning of the risks. Wehrle had received reports and written notes the Melbourne Lacrosse Tower cladding fire, that took out thirteen floors in 15 minutes.

Wehrle noted that the medical centre fire in Saudi Arabia that used FR panels was contained. “In PE, the fire would have spread over the entire height of the tower, while in this case only the area near the fire is affected. Long live FR :-)”

With Wehrle and Sontag raising these issues, why hadn't Arconic withdrawn the product - and what had senior management done about these warnings, asked Millet.

=== Module 3: Kensington and Chelsea and the KCTMO ===
On the final Monday before Easter, 29 March 2021, the inquiry started examining the culpability of the landlords and how they fulfilled their duty of care. It was revealed that fire chiefs had told Royal Borough of Kensington and Chelsea (RBKC) in April 2017 that cladding panels were a potential problem, as often they did not comply with building regulations, leading to a fire spreading from flat to flat. On receiving such a warning, the RBKC should have verified that their inspector had done the necessary facade checks and written that into future fire risk assessments. Laura Johnson, RBKC director of housing, took no action other than to forward the letter to the Kensington and Chelsea Tenant Management Organisation (KCTMO) marked ("FYI").

This was the first time survivors and bereaved had spoken to the inquiry, and were represented by the barristers, Michael Mansfield QC, Danny Friedman QC and Stephanie Barwise QC. In opening statements they accused RBKC of prioritising cost over safety, and years of neglect which formed “a landmark act of discrimination against disabled and vulnerable people” with elements of class and racial discrimination.

A key theme of this stage would be “RBKC's leadership, culture and purpose insofar as they influenced fire safety”, the inquiry was told. The professional competence of one of the key independent expert witnesses, Colin Todd, was questioned when he endorsed the unregistered Carl Stokes, KCTMO's fire safety engineer. Todd had been quoted as saying “little if any special competence is required in relation to the principles of fire safety to enable a competent fire risk assessor”. Subsequent to the fire, Todd's son Keith, has taken the position as director of fire safety for the tower's owner (RBKC). Colin Todd owns a fire consultancy, and Keith worked for him for six years. The survivors group described this relationship as distressing. Nabil Choucair, who lost six relatives in the fire, said it was an unacceptable conflict of interest.

==== The residents testify ====
On Monday 19 April seven survivors will be cross-examined on their treatment by KCTMO.

- Edward Daffarn, the 16th-floor resident who predicted the disaster on a blog months ahead of the disaster. The TMO had accused Daffarn who ran the Grenfell action group of 'souring relationships'.
- Emma O’Connor, a disabled woman who relied on crutches but lived on the 20th floor, had asked about the fire rating of the cladding and was fobbed off
- Youssef Khalloud, who lived on the 11th floor with his wife and three children. They escaped through thick black smoke at 1.28am but lost several family friends including five members of the El Wahabi family.
- Lee Chapman, a leaseholder who lived on the 22nd floor, who complained to the TMO about the wind coming through gaps in the new windows which looked as if they had been improperly fitted. He was at work when the fire struck: his wife, Naomi, who survived, was home and was speaking to him on the phone when it appeared that she wouldn't.
- David Collins, who rented a 21st-floor flat, and chaired the Grenfell Compact, a form of residents’ association. He was considered “a problem” by the TMO when he questioned the quality of the installation work of the cladding panels.

==== Residents with Disabilities ====
Survivors claim council knowingly housed people with disabilities on some of tower's highest floors, and did not discuss an individualised fire rescue plan with them as they were obliged to do. The inquiry heard that 52 of the 120 flats had disabled occupants and 15 of the 37 residents classed as vulnerable were killed. But on the night of the fire the TMO document given to the fire brigade only listed 10 who were disabled, as in residence. It was confirmed on 6 May by Teresa Brown, the director of housing at the Kensington and Chelsea Tenant Management Organisation at the time, that the council had relied on its stay put-policy and that individualised evacuation plans had not been thought necessary and were not available and had not been produced. If a tenant had asked, one could have done for them. The tenants hadn't been told this was possible. The council had knowingly put disabled tenants on the top floor without doing such a plan- even though it was known that evacuation was needed from the Adair Tower fire, and the Shepherds Court fire, in nearby Hammersmith and Fulham. In both cases the fire brigade turned up and did the evacuations and it worked and no one was hurt: the council stuck with its stay-put policy. As there was not going to be an evacuation no plans were needed.

=== Module 4: Councillors cross examined ===
In the week beginning 17 May the Conservative councillors with responsibility for housing at RBKC gave evidence and were cross-examined. Rock Feilding-Mellen, (deputy-leader) the councillor in charge of the Grenfell Tower refurbishment, was informed of plans to save money by swapping zinc cladding for aluminium in 2014 but told police he only knew about it after the June 2017 fire. He has since resigned. He was told in an appendix to an email, where the main focus had been on deciding the colour of the cladding panels. He said he didn't register the change, and “didn't know the difference between aluminium and zinc”. He had no training or expertise in housing or fire safety. He said he relied on the expertise of others. He believed in the regeneration of council estates but saw his role to question budget overruns. When the refurbishment was first discussed, he questioned it as a 2009 strategic report had recommended Grenfell be demolished.

Nicholas Paget-Brown (leader) had not verified whether the TMO executives, whom he thought of as housing professionals with appropriate CVs, knew enough about cladding a high rise to be able to hold their contractors to account. He was “surprised” that no one told him that a notice of deficiency was issued by the London Fire and Emergency Authority on Grenfell Tower in November 2016 after issues such as with non-functioning self-closing doors. The £10.3 million Grenfell Tower revamp was the biggest capital refurbishment project for a single property the TMO had managed by early 2013, and the first over-cladding project for a high-rise block.

Quentin Marshall, (chair of the Royal Borough of Kensington and Chelsea's housing scrutiny committee) told the inquiry: “I don't think we saw the bigger picture. I don't think we addressed the emotional side and I think we lacked a little humanity … We could have done better.”

Rita Dexter, the deputy commissioner of the London fire brigade, told Paget-Brown in 2015 of “a serious risk to the safety of residents” caused by the refurbishment. She urged the council to assess the risk and take appropriate remedial action. Paget-Brown did not pass that message to the TMO, or his director of housing or cabinet member, he passed it to planning. Dexter's warning highlighted compartmentation failures due to breaches by pipework, problems with smoke extraction and missing fire stopping.

Paget-Brown explained why he had not listened to Ed Daffarn, a 16th-floor resident who predicted the disaster on the Grenfell Action Blog. He found he made “wild and inaccurate allegations about what the council is planning to do”. Daffarn had criticised the councils spending priorities, putting culture spending before people. Called to account Paget-Brown had not understood the conditions that the people had to accept with regards to 'decanting before the refurbishment'.

Carl Stokes was a fire assessor employed by the TMO. He admitted that the post-nominal letters he used on his application form were for show. His job was to walk around the tower commenting on fire fighting equipment, fire doors and blocked escape routes which then reported. His job was not to comment on things outside the building. He knew about inflammable panels, but saw that as outside the scope of the report. Stokes carried out six fire safety checks on the tower from 2009 to 2016, before, during and after the disastrous refurbishment. Parts of his reports were cut and pastes from other buildings. Stokes had neither qualifications or experience to write these statutory fire assessments.

==== Kensington and Chelsea Tenants Management Organisation (TMO) ====
The CEO gave evidence on 21 June 2021: he blamed his staff for his failings. He explained that they had failed to keep the records up to date. Robert Black told the inquiry that “Information should have been updated by staff,” “The whole thing that I suffered throughout my career working with people is the ability to forget to fill in the paperwork.” The paperwork said there were 12 that needed individual rescue plans, when actually there were 35. There were no individual rescue plans in existence. Black made a decision not to act to fulfil the landlord obligation to should draw up these specific emergency evacuation plans for vulnerable and disabled people anywhere, claiming it was impractical. He had been warned by his own safety consultants and the London Fire Brigade that his fire management planning was inadequate. His director responsible for fire safety was also responsible for financial services and IT and she had no background or experience in fire safety.

Black instructed his colleague Barbara Matthews to do nothing, when Ed Daffarn had posted on a blog in November 2016 the prediction that: “Only an incident that results in serious loss of life ... will shine a light on the practices that characterise the malign governance of this non-functioning organisation.”. In written evidence Black had said he had had no contact with residents. On being reminded of petitions with large numbers of signatures in 2010, 2013, 2015 and 2017 all on the subject of safety and specifically fire safety he changed his evidence. He had also been approached by Blakeman, the local councillor who raised fire safety issues in 2012, 2013, 2015 and March 2017, three months before the fire.

Grenfell had a smoke ventilation system that was designed to keep the communal area free of smoke in event of fire that failed. It was installed at the same time as the panels. The assumption was that any fire would have been contained in one flat, and that the barriers would not be breached. The firefighters ran hoses through doors, and propped other ones open to provide egress.

The TMO specified system failed building regs, and should not have been approved by Kensington and Chelsea building control. The London fire brigade had warned building control. There had also been a non-fatal fire in 2011. Days before the fire, the main refurbishment contractor, Rydon, reported the vents were not working. A quote to fix it was ignored. The result was that the common area was filled with thick black smoke – and the principal cause of death in the fire was smoke inhalation.
