= Felicity Buchan =

British Conservative politician

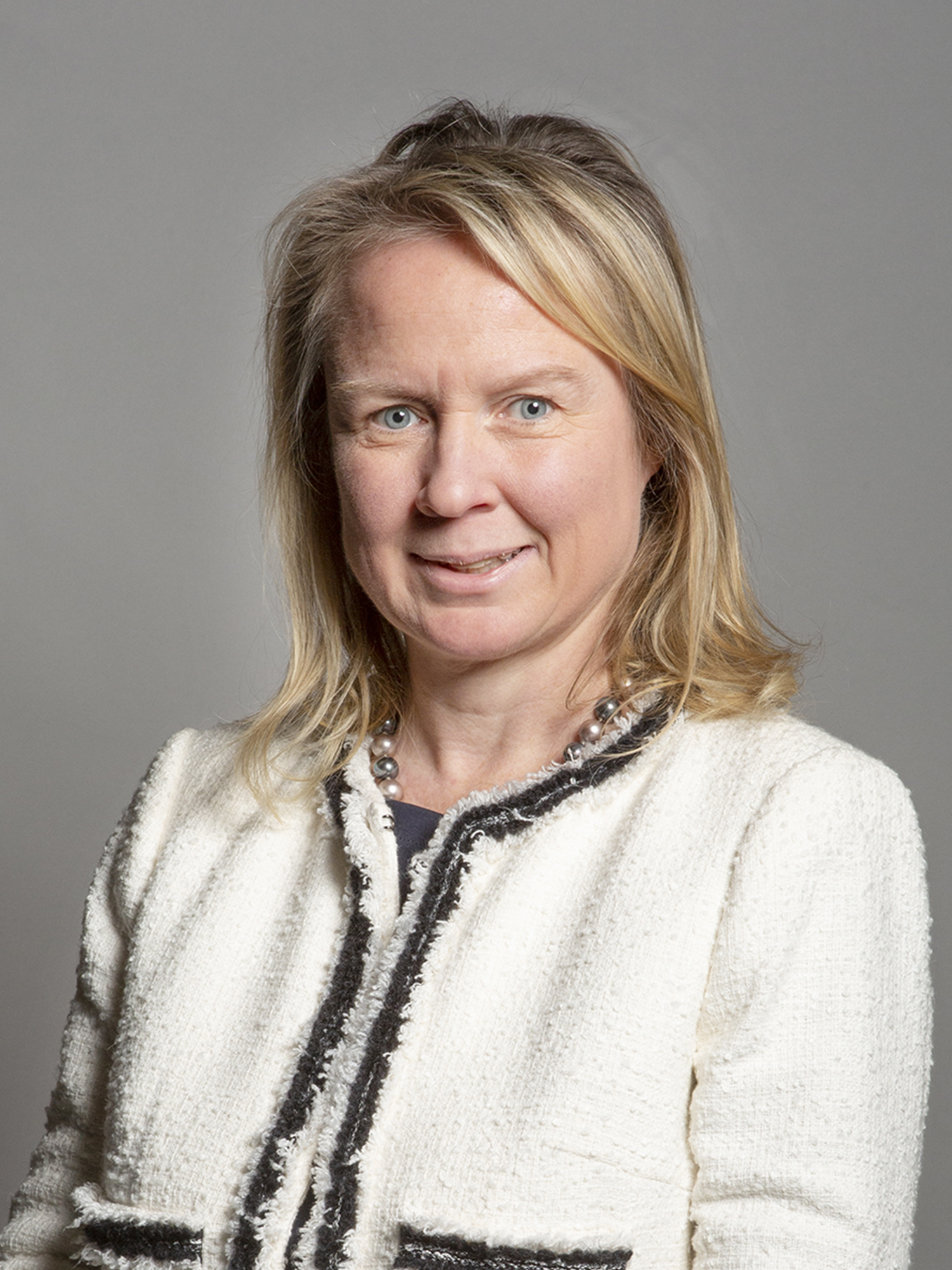
- Official portrait, 2019

Parliamentary Under-Secretary of State for Housing and Homelessness
- In office 30 October 2022 – 5 July 2024
- Prime Minister: Rishi Sunak
- Preceded by: Andrew Stephenson
- Succeeded by: Matthew Pennycook (Housing); Rushanara Ali (Homelessness)

Exchequer Secretary to the Treasury
- In office 8 September 2022 – 28 October 2022
- Prime Minister: Liz Truss
- Preceded by: Alan Mak
- Succeeded by: James Cartlidge

Member of Parliament for Kensington
- In office 12 December 2019 – 30 May 2024
- Preceded by: Emma Dent Coad
- Succeeded by: Constituency abolished

Personal details
- Born: 1970 (age 55–56) Fraserburgh, Aberdeenshire, Scotland
- Party: Conservative
- Education: Christ Church, Oxford
- Website: felicitybuchan.com

Felicity Christiana Buchan (born 1970) is a British politician and former banker who served as the Member of Parliament (MP) for Kensington in London from 2019 until the seat's abolition in 2024. A member of the Conservative Party, she served as Parliamentary under-secretary of state for Housing and Homelessness in the Department for Levelling Up, Housing and Communities from October 2022 to July 2024. Prior to this, Buchan served as Exchequer Secretary to the Treasury from September to October 2022.

Prior to her political career, Buchan worked in investment banking for JPMorgan Chase and Bank of America. Buchan stood unsuccessfully in two separate constituencies in the 2015 and 2017 elections. She was first elected to the House of Commons in the 2019 election, defeating incumbent Labour MP Emma Dent Coad.

== Early life and education ==
Buchan was born in Fraserburgh, Aberdeenshire, Scotland, the daughter of Charles, a former Scottish National Party (SNP) councillor, and Georgina Buchan. She attended Fraserburgh Academy and subsequently studied law at Christ Church, Oxford.

== Financial career ==
Buchan worked for a decade at American investment bank JPMorgan Chase in their syndicate and capital markets division, and was promoted to vice president of their European syndicate. She left the company in 2001 to join Bank of America as a managing director in its debt capital markets division. As of September 2022, she holds at least £70,000 of shares in both companies.

After leaving the financial services industry, she volunteered at a North Kensington children's charity and was the chair of governors of Bousfield Primary School.

== Early political career ==
Buchan contested South Down in Northern Ireland as a Conservative candidate in the 2015 general election, coming last with 318 (0.7%) votes. She then contested the South Shields seat in Tyne and Wear in 2017, where she came second to the incumbent Labour Party MP, Emma Lewell-Buck, with 10,570 (25.9%) votes.

During the 2017 election campaign, Buchan wrote an article for the website BrexitCentral, in which she discussed her support for "a tough Brexit deal: that means leaving the Single Market, the Customs Union and the ECJ" and decried a London-centric view of politics.

== Member of Parliament (2019-2024) ==
=== 2019 election ===
She was selected as the Conservative candidate for Kensington on 16 July 2019. Buchan had been the treasurer and a member of the board for the Kensington Chelsea & Fulham Conservatives Local Association, roles she had held until 2019. In an interview, Buchan stated she had lived in Kensington for 25 years.

When asked about her prior comments on Brexit during her 2017 campaign, she stated that she had "always campaigned for a good negotiated deal" and that she was not in favour of a "hard Brexit". She was elected as MP in the 2019 general election with a majority of 150.

=== Tenure ===
Following her election, she pledged to accept and help to implement the recommendations of the Grenfell Tower Inquiry "with a sense of urgency". The purpose of the inquiry is to investigate the Grenfell Tower fire which occurred in 2017 in North Kensington, which lies within her constituency. She was a member of the Treasury Select Committee between March 2020 and December 2021. Buchan joined the Finance Committee since March 2020.

On 7 September 2020, Buchan voted against a Labour Party amendment to the Fire Safety Bill which was intended to implement the recommendations of the first phase of the Grenfell Tower Inquiry before the end of the consultation process. This was criticised by campaign group Grenfell United and opposition politicians. She defended her vote by stating the government was "committed to implementing the recommendations", and criticised the Labour Party for "misrepresenting the vote" for political reasons.

On 23 August 2021, Prime Minister Boris Johnson appointed Buchan as the UK's trade envoy to Iceland and Norway. Buchan was appointed as a parliamentary private secretary in the Department for Business, Energy and Industrial Strategy in September 2021. Buchan resigned from her PPS role on 6 July 2022, in protest against the leadership of Prime Minister Boris Johnson over his handling of the Chris Pincher scandal.

In the September 2022 Conservative leadership election, Buchan supported Liz Truss, arguing she would be best positioned to lead the party to victory in marginal constituencies. Following Truss' victory, Buchan was appointed as Exchequer Secretary to the Treasury. In the October 2022 leadership election, Buchan supported the candidacy of Rishi Sunak. Following Sunak's victory, Buchan was appointed as Parliamentary Under Secretary of State for Housing and Homelessness in the Department for Levelling Up, Housing and Communities in October 2022.

Buchan stood in the newly created Kensington and Bayswater constituency at the 2024 general election, but was defeated.

== Personal life ==
Buchan is a member of the Chelsea Arts Club.

Parliament of the United Kingdom
Preceded by Emma Dent Coad	Member of Parliament for Kensington; 2019–2024	Constituency abolished
