= Grenfell Tower Inquiry Phase 1 =

Public inquiry into the Grenfell Tower fire

Grenfell Tower Inquiry
- Date: 14 September 2017 – (in progress)
- Location: London, United Kingdom
- Participants: Sir Martin Moore-Bick (chairman)
- Website: www.grenfelltowerinquiry.org.uk

The Grenfell Tower Inquiry is a British public inquiry into the Grenfell Tower fire, which killed 72 people and destroyed Grenfell Tower, a residential building in the Royal Borough of Kensington and Chelsea, London, on 14 June 2017. It was ordered by Prime Minister Theresa May on the day following the fire.

May announced on 29 June 2017 that the inquiry would be chaired by retired judge Sir Martin Moore-Bick, with the immediate priority "to establish the facts of what happened at Grenfell Tower in order to take the necessary action to prevent a similar tragedy from happening again". She promised that "No stone will be left unturned by this inquiry." On 15 August 2017, the terms of reference of the inquiry were announced.

== Phase One ==
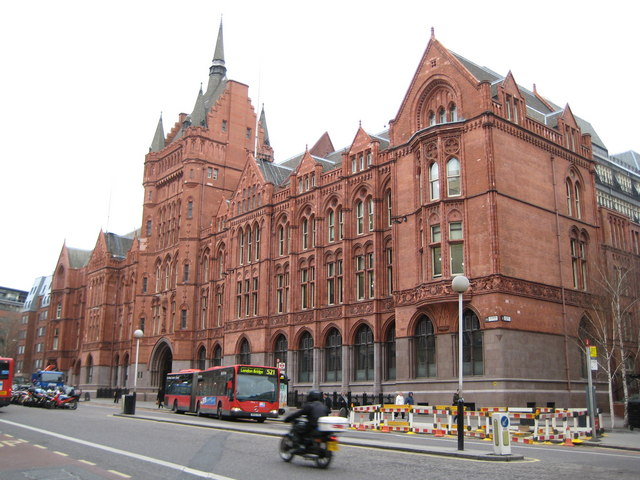
138–142 Holborn, where Phase 1 of the inquiry was held.

The inquiry opened on 14 September 2017. Procedural hearings were held in December 2017 and March 2018.

In May 2018, a series of commemorative hearings were held in which relatives and survivors paid tribute to the 72 who had died.

=== Phase 1 evidence ===
Evidential hearings began on 4 June 2018. The first week saw opening statements on behalf of the key organisations and the presentation of reports by key expert witnesses. No hearings were held in the week beginning on 11 June 2018, as the anniversary of the fire and commemorations fell within this week. The hearings resumed on 18 June 2018.

The appointed expert witnesses were:

- Barbara Lane, a fire safety engineer and director at Arup
- Professor José L. Torero, head of the Department of Civil, Environmental and Geomatic Engineering at University College London (UCL)
- Colin Todd, a fire safety consultant from CS Todd & Associates
- Professor David Purser, from Hartford Environmental Research
- Professor Edwin Galea, Professor of Mathematical Modelling at the University of Greenwich
- Ivan Stoianov, Senior Lecturer in Water Systems Engineering at Imperial College London
- J. Duncan Glover, from Failure Electrical
- Professor Luke Bisby, Professor of Fire and Structures at the University of Edinburgh
- Professor Niamh Nic Daeid, from the Centre for Anatomy and Human Identification, University of Dundee
- Rodney Hancox, Director, Gas Distribution Solutions
- Steve McGuirk, former chief fire officer of Greater Manchester, Cheshire and South Yorkshire, former president of the Chief Fire Officers Association, and former lead adviser to the Local Government Association

The witness statement from the resident of Flat 16 (where the fire started) was published. He reported he had been harassed by the media. His lawyer had requested that the inquiry's report should specifically exonerate him.

The London Fire Brigade (LFB) fire engines and 720 firefighters were deployed; Deputy Assistant Commissioner Andrew Bell, told the inquiry on Thursday that it was probably the largest deployment of breathing apparatuses ever made in the UK.

=== Firefighters' evidence ===
Evidence from the firefighters and fire officers was heard from 25 June to 2 October, with a gap in August.

The first to testify was Watch Manager Michael Dowden, the initial incident commander. His testimony lasted three days. He admitted that he had been unsure how to respond when the fire began climbing up the side of the building. Some of the questions he answered were repetitious – as they had been independently asked by the victims families. He could not continue when Richard Millett QC, counsel to the inquiry asked about a 12-year-old girl.

Moore-Bick praised Dowden for his three days of testimony, saying he had shown "courage and candour". The Fire Brigades Union (FBU) described the line of questioning about Fire Brigade Policy as "at times absurd" given Dowden's relatively low rank. Matt Wrack, the FBU general secretary said, "There clearly are important and difficult questions to ask but they should not be directed at those who do not have the power or authority to have altered policies, operational procedures or training,"

The first firefighters and officers to testify were among those who were first to respond, followed by others including senior command staff. Several firefighters reported being in life-threatening situations and felling emotional trauma after being unable to rescue certain residents. Control room staff also testified.

Issues discussed included communications problems, the sheer amount of smoke, the stay put policy that was eventually abandoned, equipment shortages, and missing fire safety features in the building such as floor plans.

Dany Cotton, who had been LFB's commissioner since January 2017, testified on 27 September. In response to questions about LFB's preparedness, she said the disaster was as unexpected as "a Space Shuttle landing on The Shard." She also said that "I wouldn't change anything we did on the night." These remarks drew criticism from survivors groups.

=== Other Phase 1 evidence ===
The inquiry also heard from representatives of the Kensington and Chelsea Tenant Management Organisation (KCTMO). KCTMO's lawyer said that although the building only had a single stairway "it managed to continue supporting evacuations and firefighting activities throughout the life of the fire" and that expert evidence suggested that 239 people could have got out after seven minutes. She said, "The inquiry will want to consider that the stairs at Grenfell Tower could have coped with a full building evacuation." They remained operational throughout the fire; 239 people could have exited within seven minutes if so instructed. Expert Dr Barbara Lane, had said the stay-put policy effectively failed at 1.23 am, but it was kept in place until 2.37 am when 107 people were still inside; 36 lived.

It was revealed that in July 2014 an official from KCTMO emailed the project team: “We need good costs for Cllr Feilding-Mellen.” At that point £300,000 was removed from the cladding budget and zinc panels were replaced with the aluminium composite material with a plastic core, which the government has now banned from use on high-rise residential blocks.

The barrister for Arconic claimed that the Reynobond aluminium composite panels cladding had not been responsible for the disaster. If the replacement windows and sub frames had been installed correctly the flames from a simple kitchen fire could not have bridged the gap into the cladding, and could have been put out with a simple fire extinguisher.

Martin Seward counsel for the FBU said that the Royal Borough of Kensington and Chelsea had failed to make an evacuation plan for Grenfell Tower and relied on an outdated "stay put" strategy, leaving it to the fire brigade on the ground to devise an evacuation strategy. He urged the inquiry to give his members from "protection from unwarranted criticism".

Adrian Williamson QC, counsel for the bereaved and survivors, said the evidence revealed “an industry in which Arconic, Celotex and Kingspan were content to push hazardous products into the marketplace and sought to market them dishonestly”.

== Phase 1 Report: October 2019 ==
Moore-Bick issued the first part of the report Wednesday 30 October 2019, though some parts had been leaked days earlier. He found that:

- The resident of the flat where the fire started was not at fault.
- The principal reason the fire spread was the aluminium composite cladding filled with plastic used on the building exterior.
- Firefighters showed "courage and devotion to duty" and 999 call operators were "unstinting" in their efforts to help trapped residents.
- Incident commanders were not trained to cope with the fire and there was no contingency plan for evacuation.
- The LFB failed to lift the "stay put" advice when the stairs remained passable, which cost lives.
- The brigade suffered "significant systemic failings".
- Communications systems failed and there were serious deficiencies in command and control.
- Pictures transmitted on the night of Grenfell could not be viewed by the LFB because the encryption was incompatible with its receiving equipment.

He highlighted Dany Cotton's rhetorical question "It's all very well saying 'get everybody out', but then how do you get them all out?", saying that it demonstrated that the London Fire Brigade had never considered that question before the night of the fire.

== Effects ==
On 6 December, Dany Cotton announced her early retirement effective from 31 December 2019 after 32 years of service. This followed calls from bereaved families and survivors of the disaster for her to quit.
