= Obligation =

Course of action someone must take

An obligation is a course of action which someone is required to take, be it a legal obligation or a moral obligation. Obligations are constraints; they limit freedom. People who are under obligations may choose to freely act under obligations. Obligation exists when there is a choice to do what is morally good and what is morally unacceptable. There are also obligations in other normative contexts, such as obligations of etiquette, social obligations, religious, and possibly in terms of politics, where obligations are requirements which must be fulfilled. These are generally legal obligations, which can incur a penalty for non-fulfilment, although certain people are obliged to carry out certain actions for other reasons as well, whether as a tradition or for social reasons.

Obligations vary from person to person: for example, a person holding a political office will generally have far more obligations than an average adult citizen, who themselves will have more obligations than a child. Obligations are generally granted in return for an increase in an individual's rights or power.

== Other uses ==
=== Biology ===
The term "obligate" can also be used in a biological context, in reference to species which must occupy a certain niche or behave in a certain way in order to survive. In biology, the opposite of obligate is facultative, meaning that a species is able to behave in a certain way and may do so under certain circumstances, but that it can also survive without having to behave this way. For example, species of salamanders in the family Proteidae are obligate paedomorphs, whereas species belonging to the Ambystomatidae are facultative paedomorphs.

=== Finance ===
In finance, "obligated" refers to funds within authorised budgets which have become legally binding expenditure commitments e.g. through letting a contract.

=== Catholicism ===
In the Catholic Church, Holy Days of Obligation or Holidays of Obligation, less commonly called Feasts of Precept, are the days on which, as canon 1247 of the 1983 Code of Canon Law states, the faithful are obliged to participate in the Mass.

== Obligation and morality ==
An obligation is contract between an individual and the thing or person to which or whom they are obligated. If the contract is breached the individual can be subject to blame. When entering into an obligation people generally do not think about the guilt that they would experience if the obligation were not fulfilled; instead they think about how they can fulfil the obligation. Rationalists argue people respond in this way because they have a reason to fulfill the obligation. According to the sanction theory, an obligation corresponds to the social pressures one feels, and is not simply derived from a singular relationship with another person or project. In the rationalist argument, this same pressure adds to the reasons people have, thereby strengthening their desire to fulfill the obligation. The sanction theory states there needs to be a sanction in order for a duty to be a moral duty.

== Sociological view versus philosophical view ==
Sociologists believe that obligations lead people to act in ways that society deems acceptable. Every society has their own way of governing, they expect their citizens to behave in a particular manner. Not only do the citizens have to oblige to the societal norms, they want to, in order to assimilate to society. Some philosophers on the other hand, argue that rational beings have moral duties, they make a choice to either fulfill these moral duties or disregard them. They have a moral responsibility to fulfill their obligations. Duty is seen as the response to an individual's obligations. Obligations require an action being done and duty is the carrying out of this action. Sociologists believe that an obligation is an objective force. Some philosophers however, believe obligations are moral imperatives.

== Types ==
=== Written ===
Written obligations are contracts. They legally bind two people into an agreement. Each person becomes responsible for doing their part of the contract. A legal contract, which does not need to be made in writing, consists of an offer, an acceptance of that offer, an intention to bind to one another in a legal agreement and a consideration, something of value to be exchanged.

=== Political ===
A political obligation is a requirement for the citizens of a society to follow the laws of that society. There are philosophical issues, however, about whether a citizen should follow a law simply because it is a law. There are various views about whether a political obligation is a moral obligation. John Rawls argues that people do have political obligations because of the principle of fairness. Humanity benefits from the joint effort of the government, so, in fairness, they should be active and supportive members of this effort. There are people, however, such as Robert Nozick, who argue enjoyment of a community effort does not mean obligation to that effort.

=== Social ===
Social obligations refer to the things humans as individuals accept because it is collectively accepted. When people agree to a promise or an agreement, they are collectively consenting to its terms. Humanity is obligated to fulfil that promise or agreement.

=== Special ===
Special obligations are those obligations owed to a particular subset of persons, such as family members, friends, and possibly fellow citizens, entered into either voluntarily (such as through marriage) or otherwise.

=== Primary and secondary ===
English law distinguishes in some case law between primary and secondary obligations. A secondary obligation, also known as an accessory obligation, is a duty that is incidental to a primary obligation. A duty to perform a secondary obligation may result, for example, as a result of their breach of a primary obligation, or by another party breaching an obligation that the secondary obligor has guaranteed.

The England and Wales Court of Appeal noted in the case of AB v CD (2014) that

The primary obligation of the party to a contract [is] to perform his contractual obligations. The obligation to pay damages in the event of breach is a secondary obligation.

and in relation to the Statute of Frauds, Lord Justice Maurice Kay commented in 2009 that

A guarantee is, in the words of the Statute, a promise "to answer for the debt default or miscarriage of another person". There must be another person who is primarily liable. The liability of the guarantor is secondary.

The Appeal Court observed in 1973 that the determination of whether a document is a guarantee or an indemnity, or whether it imposes a secondary or a primary liability, will always depend upon "the true construction of the actual words in which the promise is expressed".

Under the Louisiana Civil Code, "stipulated damages" create a secondary obligation for the purpose of enforcing a principal obligation. An aggrieved party may demand either the stipulated damages or the performance of the principal obligation, but may not demand both except for delay.

== See also ==
- Ability
- Convention
- Duty
- Law of obligations
