= Emma Dent Coad =

British politician and former Labour MP

Member of Parliament for Kensington
- In office 8 June 2017 – 6 November 2019
- Preceded by: Victoria Borwick
- Succeeded by: Felicity Buchan

Member of Kensington and Chelsea Council for St Helen's 2006–2022 for Golborne
- In office 4 May 2006 – 4 May 2026 Serving with Portia Thaxter

Personal details
- Born: Margaret Mary Dent; 2 November 1954 (age 71) London, England
- Party: Independent (since 2023)
- Other political affiliations: Labour (until 2023)
- Spouses: Sir Hadley D'Oyly (m. 1978; div. 1982); David Blott (m. 1984; div. 1997)
- Children: 3
- Education: Royal College of Art; University of Liverpool

Emma Dent Coad (born Margaret Mary Dent, 2 November 1954) is a British architectural historian and politician who served as Member of Parliament (MP) for Kensington from 2017 to 2019. A former member of the Labour Party, she was first elected a member of Kensington and Chelsea London Borough Council for Golborne ward in 2006. She resigned her Labour membership on 27 April 2023, but remained on the local council as an independent until 2026.

She stood as an independent candidate for Kensington and Bayswater at the 2024 general election, coming in sixth place, of ten candidates.

== Early life, education and early career ==
Dent Coad was born in Stepney, the youngest of six children. Her father, Charles Enrique Dent CBE, was a professor of medicine of half Spanish descent, and her mother, Margaret Ruth Coad, was an Anglican vicar's daughter who converted to Catholicism to marry him. She grew up in Chelsea and went to Sacred Heart High School, a selective grammar school in Hammersmith, London.

She graduated from the Royal College of Art with an MA in History of Design in 1992. Dent Coad has written or contributed to a number of books on architecture and design, including on Javier Mariscal, and is studying at the University of Liverpool School of Architecture for a PhD on "Constructing Modern Spain: Architecture, Politics and Ideology under Franco, 1939–1975", which she put on hold on being elected MP. She has been an organiser of the modern architecture campaign group Docomomo UK since about 2000.

== Political career ==
=== Local government ===
Dent Coad was first elected to represent Golborne (ward) on Kensington and Chelsea London Borough Council in 2006, and served as the leader of the opposition and leader of the council's Labour Group from 2014 to 2015. In the 2022 election she was elected in St Helen's ward. She left Labour in April 2023 and now sits on the council as an independent.

As a councillor, she has held the following committee and group memberships:

- Kensington and Chelsea TMO, the tenant management organisation which manages the council's housing stock, from 27 June 2008 to 31 October 2012 (council appointed)
- Housing and Property Scrutiny Committee in 2013/14
- Planning Applications Committee from May 2013 to June 2017
- Planning Committee since June 2014 to June 2017
- London Fire and Emergency Planning Authority.

Dent Coad has been critical of Universal Credit generally and also critical of a decision to roll out Universal Credit in Kensington shortly before Christmas 2018. Claimants must wait five weeks for the first payment which Dent Coad maintains is unacceptable. Dent Coad did not want yet more pain inflicted on families that have, "already lost so much" in the Grenfell fire. Dent Coad said, "It's unthinkable, they're going to have another Christmas now wondering whether they can afford to buy food, let alone presents for their children." Dent Coad stated that asking for advances for Christmas would result in people experiencing, "many future months without enough income to cover their expenses".

==== Grenfell Tower ====
Just days after Dent Coad's election, the Grenfell Tower fire took place in her then constituency. On 16 June, she blamed the Kensington and Chelsea council for failings which led to the fire. Dent Coad considers the fire an "entirely preventable" tragedy. Dent Coad said, “I can't help thinking that poor quality materials and construction standards may have played a part in this hideous and unforgivable event.” Dent Coad links the council's intention to redevelop the area to the tragedy, she said, “The council want to develop this area full of social housing, and in order to enable that they have prettified a building that they felt was ugly ... The idea that that has led to this horrendous tragedy is just unthinkable.”

She has campaigned for permanent new homes in the area for victims of the tragedy rather than, "some mucky bedsit". She has added “People are very afraid of what is going to happen next. They need to be kept within Kensington. The fear I was hearing yesterday was "they're going to send us to Peterborough or to Hastings", all the other places that the council has tried to send them before. People want to stay near their networks where their children go to school, where their families are.” Poverty in Kensington and the fire were the subjects of her maiden speech in the House of Commons on 22 June 2017.

On 4 July 2017, Dent Coad said that residents had no confidence in Sir Martin Moore-Bick to lead the Grenfell Tower Fire Inquiry, describing him as "a technocrat" who lacked "credibility". She supported calls for "reparations" to the community in the form of restoring local assets and services such as a college and a library which were under threat, and claims that many on the council see those in social housing as "lesser beings."

Dent Coad supported a call for the leaders of Kensington and Chelsea London Borough Council to resign so that there could be fresh elections. Her predecessor, Victoria Borwick, has claimed that she shared "collective responsibility" for the Grenfell Tower refurbishment, since Dent Coad had (until October 2012) sat on the board of the Kensington and Chelsea TMO which managed the tower. In a council meeting on 8 November 2012, Dent Coad praised the refurbishment announcement of the Grenfell Tower which she said showed that the council had listened to residents. However as the cladding was installed in the summer of 2016, 4 years after the alleged comment. Dent Coad has asked Borwick to retract this claim, arguing that she supported refurbishment in principle to respond to complaints about conditions, but left the TMO around the time that the broad principles of the refurbishment were agreed. She was not present when Rydon was provided with the contract, or when the decision was reportedly taken to save money on external cladding.

In a 2014/15 report, in which Dent Coad's name appears, it is reported that the housing scrutiny committee looked at the refurbishment. Conservative supporters have used this fact to ascribe responsibility to Dent Coad for the cladding, even though the cladding was installed May–June 2016, four years after she had left the committee. Facing the claim that she was partly responsible, she rejected the accusation, saying: "I didn't make any of the decisions. I didn't sign the document,". and "The point is: who signed off on that contract [to clad Glenfell]? And did they understand what was in the contract? Who specified that cladding?" Dent Coad issued a detailed rebuttal via a local blog, From the Hornet's Nest, refuting the most common accusations.

After the Grenfell Tower Inquiry final report was published on 4 September 2024, in which former housing secretary Eric Pickles and his government department was criticised for failing to act on a 2013 coroner recommendation to improve cladding fire safety regulations and his enthusiastic support of a programme to slash regulations which dominated department thinking, Dent Coad called for Pickles to "have the grace to resign" from the House of Lords and as an ethics adviser.

=== Parliamentary career ===
Dent Coad was elected as the Member of Parliament (MP) for Kensington at the 2017 snap election when she defeated the sitting Conservative Party MP Victoria Borwick, with a majority of 20 votes, overturning a 7,361 majority from the previous election two years earlier. The declaration was made after three recounts, and was the final result declared of the 2017 UK general election.

Dent Coad supported Jeremy Corbyn in the 2016 Labour leadership election. She identifies as a socialist and was a member of the Socialist Campaign Group of Labour MPs during her time in parliament.

On 29 June 2017, Dent Coad voted against the Labour party whip and for an amendment to the Queen's Speech calling for the UK's continued membership of the Single Market and the Customs Union following Brexit. Dent Coad has stated that she "will always campaign to remain in the EU" as "[her] wish for Kensington and for the country is to stay within the EU, reform regulations that do not work for us, and spend revenue fairly across the country."

Dent Coad is a republican: she joined pressure group Republic in 2005 and is a former board member. In June 2018, she suggested that the royal family move out of Buckingham Palace and that it should be open to public access, given the public contribution of one third of a billion pounds to its cost of refurbishment.

In the 2019 United Kingdom general election, Dent Coad was defeated by the Conservative Party candidate Felicity Buchan, who, with 17,768 votes, had a majority over Dent Coad of 150.

=== Later political career ===
Dent Coad remained a local councillor, and Labour group leader on Kensington and Chelsea London Borough Council.

Dent Coad continued to campaign on the Grenfell Tower tragedy. On 17 June 2022 she highlighted the fifth anniversary of the tragedy, saying, "On this day in 2017, 72 people lost their lives in the Grenfell Tower fire. Half a decade on, families are still waiting for justice – and those with the power to prevent a repeat still aren't willing to use it."

In October 2022, the national Labour Party blocked Dent Coad from being on the selection longlist for the Kensington and Bayswater parliamentary seat at the next election.

Dent Coad resigned from the Labour Party on 27 April 2023, giving several reasons including Keir Starmer's crackdown on dissent, his reneging on pledges and the ignoring of anti-black racism, with the final straw for her was being told to remove a Facebook post criticising Starmer for taking £1,000 worth of hospitality from Mulalley & Co, a company that was ordered by the High Court to pay £10.8 million damages for providing and installing defective building cladding on a residential tower block.

In August 2023, she announced her independent candidacy for the Kensington and Bayswater seat. She finished sixth and lost her deposit.

=== Criticised comments ===
In September 2017, Dent Coad was the subject of press criticism for comments about Prince Harry and his role as a British Army Apache helicopter pilot which she then withdrew. She later said that her remarks had been "a joke" which had been "taken the wrong way".

In November 2017, Dent Coad was criticised for retweeting a post on Twitter using a quotation from Roald Dahl's children's book The Twits to suggest that the Prime Minister Theresa May was 'ugly' due to her 'ugly thoughts', whereas Jeremy Corbyn had 'good thoughts' and was 'lovely'. Conservative MP George Freeman said: "The re-appearance of misogyny and racial prejudice in Corbyn's Labour Party isn't a surprise".

In November 2017, it emerged that Dent Coad had, in 2010, described Shaun Bailey, then a Conservative parliamentary candidate, now a London Assembly member, as a "token ghetto boy". In the same blog post, she quoted an anonymous former neighbour of Bailey who had described him as a "free-loading scumbag". She wrote that Bailey was being "used" by the Conservative Party and asked: "Who can say where this man will ever fit in, however hard he tries?" She proceeded to state that if Bailey were to win his seat "he will no longer be welcome in North Ken[sington]". Bailey subsequently called the comments "racist" and "hate-filled". Dent Coad later apologised for "any offence caused".

== Personal life ==
Dent Coad was married to Sir Hadley Gregory D'Oyly, 15th Baronet from 1978 to 1982. In 1984, she married David Blott, with whom she had three children; the couple divorced in 1997. She has lived in North Kensington since 1986.

After the 2019 United Kingdom general election, she announced that she had been diagnosed with breast cancer on 14 November 2019, and had surgery to remove it on 9 December. Dent Coad stated that she had not announced her diagnosis earlier as she did not want to impact her re-election campaign.

== Bibliography ==
- Emma Dent Coad, Javier Mariscal : designing the new Spain, Fourth Estate, 1991, ISBN 9780847813575
- Emma Dent Coad, Spanish Design and Architecture, Octopus Publishing, 1993, ISBN 9780289800300
- Emma Dent Coad, One Kensington : food halls, food banks and Grenfell : inside the most unequal borough in Britain, Quercus Publishing, 2022, ISBN 9781529417241

Parliament of the United Kingdom
Preceded by Victoria Borwick	Member of Parliament for Kensington; 2017–2019	Succeeded by Felicity Buchan
