= Martin Nourse =

British judge

Sir Martin Charles Nourse (3 April 1932 – 28 November 2017) was a Lord Justice of Appeal of England and Wales, who served as Vice-President of the Civil Division of the Court of Appeal of England and Wales from 2003 until his retirement from the bench in 2006.

One of his most notable cases related to multi-millionaire Sir Charles Clore. He ruled in favour of the Inland Revenue, that Clore was domiciled in England for tax purposes, despite being resident in Monaco. Clore died on his last visit to England in 1979.

Nourse's wife, Lady Lavinia Nourse (née Malim), was acquitted of 17 counts of historic child sex abuse in May 2021 and has subsequently called for law reforms to allow the accused, media anonymity unless or until they are charged.

== Education and military service ==
Nourse attended Winchester College (1945–1950) and Corpus Christi College, Cambridge. He served as a second lieutenant in the Rifle Brigade from 1951 to 1952, and subsequently in the Territorial Army in the London Rifle Brigade Rangers.

== Legal career ==
In 1956, Nourse was called to the bar (Lincoln's Inn), was made a bencher in 1978, and served as treasurer in 2001. He was a member of the General Council of the Bar from 1964 to 1968. Nourse served as a junior counsel to the Board of Trade in chancery matters from 1967 until 1970, the same year he became a Queen's Counsel. He was appointed Attorney-General of the Duchy of Lancaster in 1976 and a judge of the Jersey and Guernsey Courts of Appeal in 1977. He served in both posts until he became a High Court judge on 14 April 1980, receiving the customary knighthood, and was assigned to the Chancery Division. Nourse was made a Lord Justice of Appeal on 3 June 1985. From 1992 to 1995, he served as President of the Council of the Inns of Court. When Lord Phillips of Worth Matravers was appointed Master of the Rolls in 2000, Nourse was appointed the first Vice-President of the Civil Division to enable him to serve as Acting Master of the Rolls from June to October 2000 while Lord Phillips completed work on the Bovine spongiform encephalopathy outbreak inquiry. He continued as Vice-President until he retired from the bench the following year.

== Arms ==
Coat of arms of Martin Nourse
Motto Gaudet Sapientia Justitia
