= Vice-President of the Civil Division =

English Court of Appeal Judge

The Vice-President of the Civil Division is a Court of Appeal Judge who assists the Master of the Rolls in leading the Civil Division of the Court of Appeal of England and Wales. The power to appoint a vice-president was created by the Senior Courts Act 1981, (Note: Section 3 of the act, as originally enacted, authorised (but did not require) the Lord Chancellor to appoint a single vice-president of both the Criminal and Civil Divisions or a different judges to be vice-president of either of them. The Constitutional Reform Act 2005 transferred this power to the Lord Chief Justice after consulting the Lord Chancellor, and allowed the former to delegate the power to appoint to another judge to exercise the appointment power.) but was not exercised until Lord Phillips of Worth Matravers was appointed Master of the Rolls in 2000. Because Lord Phillips was in the process of completing the inquiry into the bovine spongiform encephalopathy (BSE) outbreak, he appointed Sir Martin Nourse the first vice-president so he could serve as Acting Master of the Rolls.

Lord Phillips opted to appoint a successor on Sir Martin Nourse's retirement the following year to deputise when he was abroad. Sir Simon Brown took up the office on the condition that he have no duties unless Lord Phillips was in fact out of the country. The next holder, Sir Henry Brooke expanded his duties to include liaising with the Court of Appeal office, the Citizens Advice Bureau, the Bar Pro Bono Unit and the Personal Support Unit; editing the Annual Review; taking a lead on the court's information technology efforts; leading the team dealing with asylum work; and overseeing the editing of the Asylum Bench Book and the Court of Appeal Bench Book. Since then, successive Lords and Lady Justices have filled the position.

== List of vice-presidents ==
- c. 6 June 2000: Sir Martin Nourse
- January 2001: Sir Simon Brown
- October 2003: Sir Henry Brooke
- 1 October 2006: Sir Mark Waller
- 6 May 2010: Sir Maurice Kay
- 1 October 2014: Sir Martin Moore-Bick
- 7 December 2016: Dame Elizabeth Gloster
- 16 July 2018: Sir Nicholas Underhill
- 9 October 2025: Sir David Bean
