= Bloomsbury EMB =

English tenant management organisation

Bloomsbury Estate Management Board
- Abbreviation: Bloomsbury EMB
- Formation: 1989
- Type: Tenant management organisation
- Legal status: Active
- Location: Birmingham, England
- Services: Social housing management
- Remarks: Manages 659 properties on behalf of Birmingham City Council; granted formal powers in 2000 under the Right to Manage regulations.

Bloomsbury EMB (Estate Management Board) is a tenant management organisation in England, running 659 social housing properties on behalf of Birmingham City Council.

== Background ==
Bloomsbury EMB was one of the first estate management boards set up in England, established in 1989. When the UK Government introduced the 'Right to Manage' regulations in 1994, the EMB wanted to use these to take formal responsibility for running the estate, but it took until 2000 to take on these powers through the negotiation of a formal management agreement.
