= Benita Mehra =

British engineer

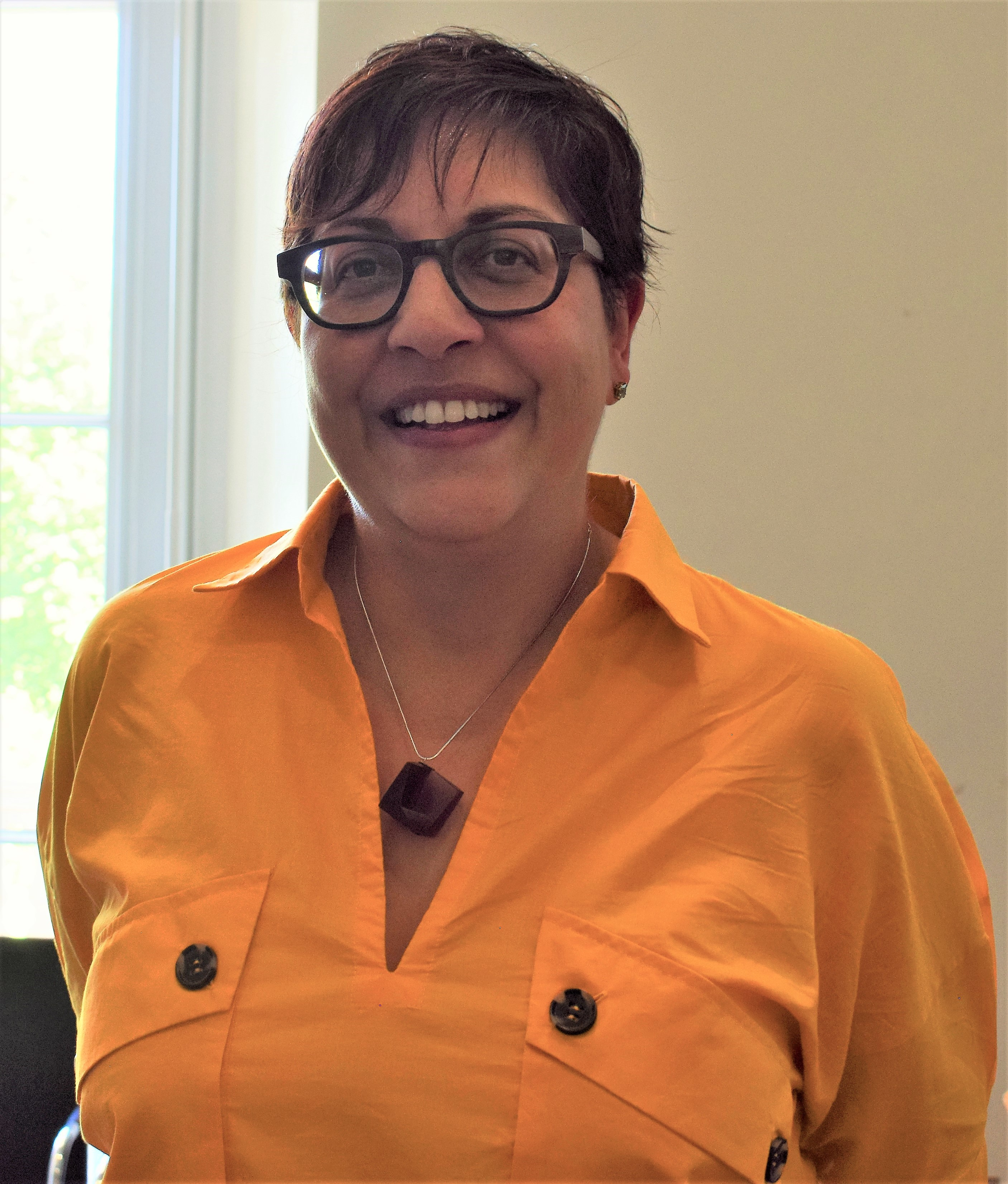
- Benita Mehra on 26 June 2018
- Education: City, University of London; Henley Business School
- Organization: Women's Engineering Society

Benita Mehra FIET, FWES, FIHEEM is a British engineer based in London. She was President of the Women's Engineering Society from 2015 to 2018.

== Education and career ==
Mehra studied Electrical & Electronic Engineering at the City University London before completing an MSc in Construction Management at Heriot-Watt University. Upon graduation she joined British Airports Authority (BAA) the airports operator and with their support attained chartered status, having been seconded from BAA into a manufacturing company.

In 2005, Mehra achieved an MBA in Henley Business School, allowing her to manage large groups of engineers.

In 2015 she became a Fellow of the Institute of Healthcare Engineering and Estate Management, and the Institution of Engineering and Technology in 2016.

=== Grenfell Tower Inquiry ===
The British prime minister Boris Johnson appointed Mehra to the Grenfell Tower inquiry, having undertaken a (non-transparent) due diligence of Benita Mehra.

Given that Benita Mehra had run an organisation (the Women's Engineering Society) that had received a £71,000 grant from the Arconic Foundation - the philanthropic arm of the very manufacturer who created the cladding that played such a pivotal role in the Grenfell fire - her appointment and willingness to take up the position sparked controversy with many in the Grenfell community while Mehta insisted on there being no conflict of interest. Unite the Union assistant general secretary for legal services Howard Beckett, said "Benita Mehra has a clear conflict of interest and she should play no role in the inquiry". He further said "Benita Mehra's claim that there is no conflict of interest is simply not plausible". Only after sustained outcry by the Grenfell community, a handful of major media outlets, and Grenfell United, did Benita Mehra resign from the Grenfell Tower inquiry.

Prime Minister accepts resignation of Grenfell Tower Inquiry panel member. The Prime Minister said: "I can confirm that Benita Mehra wrote to me yesterday to offer her resignation from the Grenfell Tower Inquiry panel and I have accepted. I would like to thank Benita for her commitment and I am very grateful for her sensitivity to the work of the Inquiry."

In her letter she had hoped to draw on her experience and knowledge of the construction industry, of community engagement and of governance within housing management contribute to the vital work of the Inquiry in discovering how and why the devastating fire at Grenfell Tower happened.

However, it is apparent that her former role as President of the Women's Engineering Society (WES), which in 2017 accepted a charitable donation from the Arconic Charitable Foundation to support the mentoring of women engineers and apprentices, has caused serious concerns to a number of the bereaved, survivors and resident Core Participants. Within her letter to the Prime Minister she made it quite clear she had not had any contact with either the Arconic Charitable Foundation or Arconic and her involvement in the donation was to review the initial proposal.

As President of WES, her role was unpaid and the grant from the Arconic Charitable Foundation was ring-fenced to fund the mentoring scheme alone, and for these reasons, she did not link any aspect of her former role as President to the panel member for the Grenfell Tower Inquiry.

She did not feel to cause any further distress to those who had already suffered such unimaginable losses and trauma, nor to create any distractions from the vital work of the public inquiry and felt no option but to tender her resignation as a panel member of the Independent Inquiry into Grenfell Tower.

Many in the Grenfell community, as well as MP's including Labour Deputy Leader and MP for Hackney North and Stoke Newington, Diane Abbott, saw her appointment and her acceptance of the position as unacceptable.

== Diversity ==
In 2016, Mehra became the President of the Women's Engineering Society. Under her guidance, National Women in Engineering Day (NWED) became an international celebration. She has campaigned for women to be more readily welcomed back into the engineering workforce after time taken out for maternity leave, and encouraging small-to-medium enterprises to explore job-sharing for mid career workers.

Mehra works to inspire the next generation, working with teachers and girls to highlight careers in engineering. She was a judge of the annual Top 50 Women in Engineering campaign run by the Women's Engineering Society in partnership with The Telegraph newspaper. She received an Honorary Doctorate for Science for her diversity work from Chichester University in 2017. and as a diversity champion was awarded an honorary degree.
