= St Helen's (ward) =

Electoral ward in London, England

- Electoral ward for the Kensington and Chelsea London Borough Council
- Borough: Kensington and Chelsea
- County: Greater London
- Population: 6,158 (2021)
- Area: 0.4558 km²

Current electoral ward
- Created: 2014
- Councillors: 3

St Helen's is an electoral ward in the Royal Borough of Kensington and Chelsea. The ward was first used in the 2014 elections and elects three councillors to Kensington and Chelsea London Borough Council.

== Councillors ==
| Election | Councillors | |
|---|---|---|
| 2022 | Emma Dent Coad (Labour) (Independent since 2023) | Portia Thaxter (Labour) |

== Elections ==
=== 2022 ===
St Helen's (2)
| Party | Candidate | Votes | % | ±% |
|---|---|---|---|---|
| Labour | Emma Dent Coad | 811 | 52.1 | −0.4 |
| Labour | Portia Thaxter | 739 | 47.5 | −1.8 |
| Conservative | Miloud Bouhaddou | 522 | 33.5 | +3.5 |
| Conservative | Maxwell Woodger | 521 | 33.5 | −0.2 |
| Liberal Democrats | Carmel McLoughlin | 167 | 10.7 | −3.2 |
| Liberal Democrats | Jibril Al-Nabahani | 118 | 7.6 | −3.0 |
| Independent | Eve Allison | 77 | 4.9 | −28.8 |
| Turnout | | | 36.2 | |
| Labour hold | | Swing | | |
| Labour hold | | Swing | | |

== See also ==
- List of electoral wards in Greater London
