= Kensington and Chelsea TMO =

Tenant management company in London

- Formation: 1 April 1996; 30 years ago
- Website: www.kctmo.org.uk

Kensington and Chelsea TMO (KCTMO) was the largest tenant management organisation (TMO) in England, managing nearly 10,000 properties on behalf of Kensington and Chelsea London Borough Council – the entire council housing stock in the Royal Borough of Kensington and Chelsea.

The TMO was set up on 1 April 1996, under the UK Government's Housing (Right to Manage) Regulations 1994. Kensington and Chelsea TMO was the largest TMO in the UK and unique in having been the only TMO that managed the entire housing stock for the local council.

Following the Grenfell Tower fire in 2017, the council terminated its contract with KCTMO. Since January 2018, the housing has been directly managed by the council. However, KCTMO continues to exist as a legal entity so that it can be represented at the Grenfell Tower Inquiry.

== History ==
The Kensington and Chelsea Tenant Management Organisation was established on 1 April 1996, when it assumed management of 9,760 properties from the council. Run by a board of 13 tenants, and taking the legal form of a Company limited by guarantee, it was described at the time as "one of Britain's most ambitious property management schemes".

In December 2017, the TMO board decided that it could no longer guarantee that it could deliver services to a standard that residents should expect and fulfil all its duties contained in its contract with the council (known as the modular management agreement or MMA). The board decided that it would be in the best interests of all residents that the services which the TMO provided were handed back to the council while it carries out a consultation about the future management of its housing stock.

The handback took place on 1 March 2018. The handback consisted of all the services to residents and those support functions required to enable these services to be provided. The TMO continues to exist as an independent corporate entity and the board will continue to be accountable to its members. The resident-led board has an ongoing role in scrutinising the delivery of services under the MMA, as well as ensuring ongoing assistance to the public inquiry and criminal investigation. The council has confirmed that it will continue to fund the TMO to ensure it can continue to do so, and that answers to the Grenfell Tower Inquiry are obtained.

== Oversight and membership ==
Membership was open to any named tenant or leaseholder of a property owned by the Royal Borough of Kensington and Chelsea who is over the age of eighteen. Since the day-to-day activities of the organization ended, the membership criteria have changed slightly, notably allowing any former resident of Grenfell Tower who lost their home due to the fire to be a member, regardless of their current tenancy status.

The TMO has a board comprising eight residents, four council-appointed board members and three independent board members. Labour councillor and former MP Emma Dent Coad was a council-appointed board member from 2008 to 31 October 2012.

== Recognition ==
Kensington and Chelsea TMO has previously received a three-star status from the Audit Commission for its services. In 2008 Juliet Rawlings, chair of the TMO's Board from 2003, was appointed MBE in the Queen's Birthday Honours for her work with the organisation. In 2016 the chair, Fay Edwards, was awarded the British Empire Medal for her services to the community in Kensington and Chelsea.

== Grenfell Tower fire ==
On 14 June 2017 a large fire engulfed Grenfell Tower, a 24-floor, 120-flat block managed by KCTMO.

Grenfell Action Group, the block's tenant organisation, had repeatedly warned of major fire safety lapses since 2013. A blog entry posted on 20 November 2016 described KCTMO as "an evil, unprincipled, mini-mafia" and predicted that only a "catastrophic event" leading to "serious loss of life" such as "a serious fire in a tower block" would result in change. At a meeting in January 2016, the residents association presented the findings of a survey which found that 68% of residents had felt harassed or intimidated by the KCTMO or its contractors, and that 90% were dissatisfied with the manner in which improvement works had been carried out. In the aftermath of the disaster, KCTMO has been further criticised for appealing to the public for donations to support the victims, despite giving no indication that it is donating to them itself.

In August 2017, it was announced that KCTMO would no longer manage the Lancaster West Estate containing Grenfell Tower, which would come under direct council control. In September 2017 Kensington and Chelsea councillors voted unanimously to end the contract with KCTMO, stating that the firm "no longer has the trust of residents in the borough". In late December 2017 KCTMO announced that it would be handing control of all of its housing stock back to the council by 31 January 2018 as an "interim measure".
