= Elizabeth Gloster =

Former judge of the Court of Appeal of England and Wales (born 1949)

The Right Honourable Dame Elizabeth Gloster DBE
- Royal coat of arms of the United Kingdom

Lady Justice of Appeal
- In office 9 April 2013 – 1 June 2018
- Monarch: Elizabeth II

High Court Judge
- In office 21 April 2004 – 9 April 2013

Personal details
- Born: 5 June 1949 (age 77)
- Spouses: Stanley Brodie QC (div. 2004); Sir Oliver Popplewell (m. 2008; died 2024)
- Education: Girton College, Cambridge
- Occupation: Judge
- Profession: Barrister

Dame Elizabeth Gloster, Lady Popplewell, DBE, PC (born 5 June 1949) is a British lawyer. She served as a judge of the Court of Appeal of England and Wales and was Vice‑President of its Civil Division. Earlier, she became the first female judge of the Commercial Court.

== Education ==
Gloster was educated at Roedean School and Girton College, Cambridge.

== Career ==
Gloster was called to the bar by the Inner Temple in 1971, and became a bencher there in 1992. She was appointed Queen's Counsel in 1989, and went on to serve as a judge of the Courts of Appeal of Jersey and Guernsey from 1993. In 1995 she was made a Recorder.

On 21 April 2004, Gloster was appointed a High Court judge, receiving the customary appointment as a Dame Commander of the Order of the British Empire (DBE) and being assigned to the Queen's Bench Division (Commercial Court). From 2010 to 2012, she served as the judge in charge of the Commercial Court.

In 2012, Gloster presided over a high-profile case in which Boris Berezovsky claimed £3 billion in damages from Roman Abramovich, alleging that Abramovich had intimidated him into selling his shares in the Russian oil company Sibneft. Gloster found Berezovsky to be "an inherently unreliable witness" and ruled in favour of Abramovich. A Times editorial endorsed the judge's conclusion.

At the opening of the trial, Gloster had disclosed in court that her stepson had earlier acted as a barrister for Abramovich during a preliminary stage of the proceedings. Berezovsky's legal team stated that their client raised no objection to her continuing to hear the matter. They later contended that the extent of the barrister's involvement—for which he had been paid £469,000 in fees—had been understated, though they did not appeal the judgment. When asked outside the court whether he believed Russia's President Vladimir Putin would be pleased with the ruling, Berezovsky replied, "Sometimes I have the impression that Putin himself wrote this judgment."

A statement issued by the Judicial Office, which represents judges, confirmed that Dame Elizabeth's stepson had not appeared at any hearing at which she had presided. It added, "Where a judge has disclosed a family relationship to the parties, it is a matter for the judge's own discretion whether he or she should recuse themselves. The proper way to challenge a decision not to recuse is by way of an appeal to the courts."

On 9 April 2013, Dame Elizabeth was appointed a Lady Justice of Appeal and was consequently sworn of the Privy Council.

She became Vice-President of the Civil Division of the Court of Appeal on 7 December 2016, succeeding Lord Justice Moore‑Bick upon his retirement. She retired from the Court of Appeal on 1 June 2018.

She continues to sit as a commercial court judge, applying English common law, in the ADGM (Abu Dhabi Global Market) Courts.

=== Judgments ===
- Relfo Ltd v Varsani [2014] EWCA Civ 360 – a case in English unjust enrichment law concerning the extent to which a defendant's enrichment must be at the expense of the claimant; Gloster LJ delivered a concurring opinion with Arden LJ.

== Private life ==
In 2005, Elizabeth Gloster was divorced from Stanley Brodie QC. On 15 March 2008, she married Sir Oliver Popplewell.
