= John Moore-Bick =

British Army general (born 1949)

Major General John Moore-Bick CBE DL
- Born: 10 October 1949 (age 77)
- Military career
- Allegiance: United Kingdom
- Branch: British Army
- Service years: 1971–2005
- Rank: Major General
- Commands: UK Support Command (Germany)
- Conflicts: Gulf War; Bosnian War
- Awards: Commander of the Order of the British Empire

Major General John David Moore-Bick CBE DL (born 10 October 1949) is a former British Army officer who commanded United Kingdom Support Command (Germany).

== Early and private life ==
Moore-Bick is the son of John Ninian Moore-Bick and his wife Kathleen (née Beall). He is the younger brother of Sir Martin Moore-Bick, a Lord Justice of Appeal. He was educated at Stonegate CE Primary School in Wadhurst, The Skinners' School in Royal Tunbridge Wells, and at St Catherine's College, Oxford. He married Anne Horton in 1973. They have one daughter.

== Military career ==
Moore-Bick was commissioned into the Royal Artillery in 1971 and transferred to the Royal Engineers in 1972, serving with 45 Commando and 23 Amphibious Engineer Squadron until 1979. He attended the German General Staff Course (Führerakademie der Bundeswehr) from 1980 to 1982. He became military assistant to the Chairman of the NATO Military Committee in 1987, served as Commanding Officer of 21 Engineer Regiment during the Gulf War. After attending the Higher Command and Staff Course at the Staff College, Camberley in 1994, he became chief engineer for the NATO Implementation Force in Bosnia and Herzegovina in 1995. He became Director of Staff Duties at the Ministry of Defence in 1997, became leader of the study team into Defence Postgraduate Academic Training in 1999 and was appointed military advisor to the High Representative for Bosnia and Herzegovina in 2000.

He became General Officer Commanding United Kingdom Support Command (Germany) in 2001 and then United Kingdom Special Defence Adviser to Serbia and Montenegro in 2003 before retiring in 2005. He was Colonel Commandant of the Royal Engineers from 2002 to 2012.

== Later career ==
He was General Secretary of the Forces Pension Society from 2007 to 2015 and was Chairman of the Governors of The Skinners' School in Tunbridge Wells, Kent from 2005 until June 2015. He became Deputy Lieutenant of East Sussex in 2006. He was Master of the Skinners' Company in 2008–9. He became a governor of Plumpton College in 2016.

Military offices
Preceded by Christopher Elliott	GOC United Kingdom Support Command (Germany); 2001–2003	Succeeded by David Bill
