= Barbara Lane (engineer) =

Engineer

Barbara Lane CEng FREng FRSE is an Irish fire protection engineer. She is a director at Arup.

She graduated from Trinity College Dublin and University of Edinburgh. She is an expert witness for the Grenfell Tower inquiry.

== Works ==
- Flint, Graeme; Usmani, Asif; Lamont, Susan; Lane, Barbara; Torero, Jose (2007-12-01). "Structural Response of Tall Buildings to Multiple Floor Fires". Journal of Structural Engineering. 133 (12): 1719–1732. doi:10.1061/(ASCE)0733-9445(2007)133:12(1719). ISSN 0733-9445.
- Lamont, S. (2006-02-01). "Behavior of Structures in Fire and Real Design - A Case Study" (PDF). Journal of Fire Protection Engineering. 16 (1): 5–35. doi:10.1177/1042391506054038. hdl:1842/1499. ISSN 1042-3915.
