= Grenfell Tower Inquiry =

Public inquiry into the Grenfell Tower fire

- Date: 14 September 2017 – 10 February 2025 (7 years, 4 months, and 27 days)
- Location: London, England, UK
- Participants: Sir Martin Moore-Bick (chairman); Ali Akbor OBE; Thouria Istephan
- Website: www.grenfelltowerinquiry.org.uk

The Grenfell Tower Inquiry was a British public inquiry into the Grenfell Tower fire, which killed 72 people and destroyed Grenfell Tower on 14 June 2017. It was ordered by Prime Minister Theresa May on the day following the fire.

May announced on 29 June 2017 that the inquiry would be chaired by retired judge Sir Martin Moore-Bick, with the immediate priority "to establish the facts of what happened at Grenfell Tower in order to take the necessary action to prevent a similar tragedy from happening again". She promised that "No stone will be left unturned by this inquiry." On 15 August 2017, the terms of reference of the inquiry were announced. The first hearing opened on 14 September 2017.

The inquiry was divided into two phases: Phase 1, which addressed the events on the night of the fire, and Phase 2, which investigated the wider situation. Hearings for Phase 1 were held in June–December 2018 in Holborn, Central London. The report for the findings of Phase 1 was published on 30 October 2019. The Phase 2 hearings commenced on 28 January 2020 at a location in Paddington. Hearings after 16 March 2020 were suspended until further COVID-19 resilient arrangements could be put in place.

The inquiry published its second and final report on 4 September 2024. The 1,700-page report of the six-year public inquiry "sets out how a chain of failures across government and the private sector led to Grenfell Tower becoming a death trap".

Imran Khan KC is a barrister for the bereaved and survivors. Richard Millet KC was the counsel to the inquiry.

The inquiry formally closed on 10 February 2025. A concurrent 9-year police inquiry ended with charges being forward to the Crown Prosecution Service on 30 September 2026.

== Background ==
Map of the western side of the Lancaster West Estate

Timescale of the disaster

Grenfell Tower was a 24-storey residential tower block in North Kensington, London, England. It was completed in 1974, as part of the first phase of the Lancaster West Estate.

The concrete structure's top 20 storeys consisted of 120 flats, with a total of 200 bedrooms. Its first four storeys were nonresidential until its most recent refurbishment in 2015–2016, which converted two of them to residential use, bringing it up to 127 flats and 227 bedrooms. It also received new plastic framed windows and new cladding with thermal insulation.

A major fire seriously damaged the building on 14 June 2017, causing the deaths of 72 of the 293 people who were believed to be in the 129-flat tower that night.

== Initiation ==
The day after the fire broke out, Theresa May, the then prime minister, announced that there would be an inquiry into its causes. She made a statement to Parliament on 22 June announced a judge-led inquiry, saying "No stone will be left unturned by this Inquiry".

Sophie Khan, who acted as solicitor for some families in the Lakanal House fire, told BBC Two's Newsnight that inquests would be better for the families as they would allow the families to participate and ask questions. She said the coroner was independent but a public inquiry was government-led and she wondered what information the Prime Minister knew that she wanted to hide. Another solicitor, Louise Christian, who also acted for families in relation to Lakanal House, wrote in The Guardian that a public inquiry was the best approach. She wrote about a promised public inquiry for Lakanal House being "downgraded to an inquest" and that inquests would be delayed by a criminal investigation. She acknowledged that victims' interests are often sidelined in a public inquiry but wrote that the scope of a public inquiry is wider and that a rapid inquiry would put the government under more pressure to implement its findings immediately.

=== Appointment of Martin Moore-Bick ===
On 29 June, May announced that Sir Martin Moore-Bick, a retired judge, would lead the inquiry. She stated that "Before the Inquiry starts Sir Martin will consult all those with an interest, including survivors and victims’ families, about the terms of reference." Moore-Bick met some survivors of the fire that day, and cautioned against giving the inquiry too much scope.

The appointment was met with some criticism from survivors, as well as Emma Dent Coad, the MP for Kensington. The chief criticisms were towards Moore-Bick's background in commercial law, his different social background to the survivors and his previous ruling in a Westminster City Council case, in which he had allowed a local resident to be rehoused 50 miles away. This decision had been overturned on appeal by the Supreme Court. Dent Coad said "We need somebody who can do the detail but we need somebody who can actually understand human beings as well." During two public meetings held by the inquiry before the finalisation of the terms of reference, various residents criticised the lack of diversity of the inquiry panel, saying that it did not represent the community.

An anonymous legal columnist (the author of The Secret Barrister) in the New Statesman wrote that "The bulk of this objection, it appears, arises out of a rapidly cultivated image of Sir Martin as an establishment Mr Whitewash." The columnist argued that Moore-Bick's background as a "fact finder" in commercial law made him far better suited to the role than a criminal judge, and that getting the inquiry to empathise with the survivors "can be achieved without sacking the chair and starting again." Lord Chancellor David Lidington said Moore-Bick would lead the inquiry "with impartiality and a determination to get to the truth and see justice done".

=== Inquiry panel and assessors ===
The Grenfell Tower Inquiry was chaired by Sir Martin Moore-Bick, a retired judge, who initially served as the sole decision-making panel member during Phase 1. For Phase 2, the government decided to appoint two additional panel members to provide expertise in areas relevant to the inquiry.

On 30 May 2019, Prime Minister Theresa May announced the appointment Nabeel Hamdi, an academic specialising in housing and participatory design and planning, and Thouria Istephan, an architect and partner at Foster and Partners, as additional panel members for Phase 2.

Hamdi was subsequently unable to take up his appointment. On 23 December 2019, Prime Minister Boris Johnson formally appointed Istephan and Benita Mehra, a chartered engineer, to the inquiry panel, with Mehra replacing Hamdi.

Mehra resigned from the panel in January 2020. On 14 October 2020, the government announced the appointment of Ali Akbor OBE, then chief executive of Unity Homes and Enterprise, as the third panel member for Phase 2. He formally joined the panel on 2 November 2020. His experience in social housing, local government and community engagement was identified as relevant to the inquiry's work.

The final Inquiry panel comprised Sir Martin Moore-Bick as chairman, alongside Ali Akbor OBE and Thouria Istephan. All three were named as panel members in the final Phase 2 report, published on 4 September 2024.

==== Assessors ====
The inquiry was also supported by independent assessors, who provided specialist advice but were not members of the decision-making panel. The original assessors were Joyce Redfearn, a former local authority chief executive; Joe Montgomery, a housing and regeneration professional; and David Nethercot, a civil engineer.

Redfearn resigned in October 2019 and was replaced by John Mothersole, former chief executive of Sheffield City Council, in February 2021. Montgomery and Nethercot continued to assist the inquiry during Phase 2.

=== Terms of reference ===
The inquiry leadership held a consultation on the inquiry's terms of reference throughout July 2017, which concluded on 4 August.

On 30 June, Labour Party leader Jeremy Corbyn wrote to May to say that the inquiry's terms should be broad, because the fire had "much wider implications for national policy issues". Former Lord Chancellor Lord Falconer said that "The inquiry has got to look at how [the regulatory] regime developed, or I think the residents would feel they were let down." On 17 July, he again wrote to May, saying: "As I set out in my letter dated 30 June, there is considerable concern among residents and others that the judge leading the inquiry has already been directed towards a narrowly defined Terms of Reference, which will not bring residents the answers they seek."

On 15 August 2017, Theresa May announced the terms of reference. The inquiry's role would be to examine "the circumstances surrounding the fire", including its causes, how it spread to the whole building, and the adequacy of the regulations and safety measures in place.

The Grenfell Next of Kin group, accuses the Royal Borough of Kensington of “contemptuous disregard” in the decision-making processes that led to the tragedy. It said “Systemic racism goes deep to the heart of the problem that caused the catastrophe. Questions around race and social class is at the heart of this truth-seeking and we would be grateful if you can revisit it and add it as an extra module.”

=== Social housing ===
Labour Party politicians and some survivors have argued that the inquiry should include an examination of national policy in national policy towards social housing. In his letter to Theresa May proposing the Terms, which were agreed without amendment, Moore-Bick had noted that many of those affected by the fire and others had been in favour of this. He argued, however, that this would add significantly to the time required to complete his work, and that such an examination was better suited to a different kind of process and not to a judge-led inquiry. in her response, Theresa May said that the Housing Minister Alok Sharma would "personally meet and hear from as many social housing tenants as possible" both in the immediate area and further afield.

In response, Corbyn wrote an open letter to May saying: "The fire has raised profound concerns about the way that social housing is provided and managed in this country, and I as well as many survivors worry that without a wider focus, the inquiry will fail to get fully to grips with the causes of the fire." Corbyn also said May should "immediately set out a clear, independent and thorough process for identifying and addressing the broader failings that led to the Grenfell fire." Matt Wrack of the Fire Brigades Union said, "Central government has created the housing and fire safety regime and central government must be held to account for any failings in it. Yet the terms of reference signed off by Theresa May appear designed to avoid this."

=== Controversies ===
Two former panel members from the Independent Inquiry into Child Sexual Abuse raised concerns about the ability of the inquiry to be independent of the government.

Matt Wrack, the general secretary of the Fire Brigades Union, argued that the order of the inquiry made the fire service's role too prominent, while other issues will be addressed in the second phase when public interest will have faded.

On 7 January 2018, an open letter to the Prime Minister signed by 71 academics and several politicians was published. This described concern for a possible conflict of interest of the auditors KPMG, who audited the Royal Borough of Kensington and Chelsea and companies responsible for the cladding on Grenfell Tower. This was viewed by signatories as a conflict with their neutrality on the inquiry. In response, KPMG agreed to immediately withdraw from the inquiry and waive its fees.

== Phase 1 ==
=== Phase 1 Recommendations ===
There were 46 recommendations embedded within 35 paragraphs of chapter 33 of the four-volume full report, and published again in the executive summary. The press have printed a selection. For example, The Guardian published:

- A law requiring owners and managers of high-rise residential buildings to provide their local fire and rescue service with information about external wall materials and building plans.
- Fire brigade inspections of high-rise buildings to be improved and crews trained to carry out more thorough risk evaluations. Regular inspections of lifts intended to be used by firefighters are needed.
- Communications between fire brigade control rooms, where emergency calls are received, and incident commanders must improve and there must be a dedicated communication link.
- Government should develop national guidelines for carrying out partial or total evacuations of high-rise residential buildings.
- Fire doors in all multi-occupancy, residential properties should be urgently inspected.
- Improvements should be made to the data links provided by helicopters of the National Police Air Service.

== Phase 2 ==
The decision-making panel for the final stage of Phase 2 comprised chairman Sir Martin Moore-Bick, Ali Akbor OBE and Thouria Istephan. The three panel members were responsible for the inquiry's final report, which was presented to Parliament on 4 September 2024. The longer phase 2 commenced in 2019 and was seriously delayed by the COVID-19 pandemic. Phase 2 was divided into eight modules:

1. The 2015-16 refurbishment
2. The testing, certification and marketing of the cladding panels and external insulation
3. The management of Grenfell Tower, including how residents' complaints were handled
4. Central and local government responses to the disaster
5. The response of London Fire Brigade
6. Building regulations and enforcement
7. Remaining expert evidence
8. Evidence relating to the deceased

=== Phase 2 report ===
The 1,700-page Phase 2 report was released on 4 September 2024. According to the BBC, the report blamed "a chain of failures across government and the private sector". It argued that the refurbishment had created an "unedifying 'merry-go-round of buck-passing'", with the architect, principal contractor and cladding sub-contractor all failing to take responsibility for fire safety. It also criticised the "systemic dishonesty" of the cladding manufacturers that concealed the fire risk of the cladding panels, the breakdown in trust between the TMO and residents and the “seriously defective” building safety regime in England and Wales, including the Building Research Establishment which it argued had been exposed to “unscrupulous product manufacturers" since privatisation.

Both Oliver Wainwright in The Guardian and Nat Barker in Dezeen noted that the report had been especially damning in its criticism of Studio E, the architects of the refurbishment. Wainwright argued that it highlighted broader problems in the profession, while Barker said that while the report had "few surprises," its criticism of the architects was "perhaps its most remarkable aspect". Wainwright argued that architects' work has increasingly become "detached from the reality of construction" and outsourced to subcontractors, "leaving the architect as an increasingly ineffectual middleman" and a "professional buck-passer".

== Cost ==
The final cost of the inquiry, incurred between 1 August 2017 and 31 January 2025, was £178 million.

== Related actions ==
The Metropolitan Police Service investigated criminal manslaughter, corporate manslaughter and other charges. On 30 September 2026 they passed evidence relating to 20 companies and 54 individuals to the Crown Prosecution Service (CPS) , after a 9 year process involving 220 personnel. The list of charges included violations the Health and Safety at Work etc. Act 1974 which obliges employees to 'take reasonable care for the health and safety of anyone "who may be affected by his acts or omissions at work." There are also threats of civil litigation. Arconic and Celotex are facing civil litigation from the bereaved in US courts, which lawyers estimate could cause a payout worth hundreds of millions of dollars.
