= Institute of Healthcare Engineering and Estate Management =

Non-profit

The Institute of Healthcare Engineering and Estate Management (IHEEM) is the UK's largest specialist Institute for the Healthcare Estates Sector; devoted to developing careers, provision of education and training and registering engineers as Eng Tech, IEng and CEng.

== History ==
The institute was founded in 1943 and was originally named the Institute of Hospital Engineers.

The Society of X-Ray Technology was composed of medical physicists, radiographers, engineers and technicians who worked with medical radiation equipment. It became part of the Institute in 1990.

== Structure ==
It is headquartered in the Cumberland Business Centre in Portsmouth, on the A2030.

IHEEM:

- is a not-for-profit company. Their primary purpose, as a professional development organisation, is to keep members up to date with developing technology and changing regulations within the industry
- is independent of government, the NHS and commercial interests and protects its impartiality and objectivity.

IHEEM's members comply with a Code of Professional Conduct that places a personal obligation to uphold the dignity and reputation of the profession and to safeguard public interest; each member undertakes to exercise all reasonable professional skill and care and to discharge this responsibility with integrity.

The Institute counts among its members employees of both public and private healthcare providers, engineering and consultancy firms and practices. Increasingly members come from a non-engineering background, many with Facilities Management experience.

== See also ==
- Chartered engineer
- Incorporated engineer
- Engineering technician
