= Ali Akbor =

British housing expert

- Known for: Grenfell Tower fire inquiry
- Title: Deputy lieutenant of Greater Manchester
- Honours: Order of the British Empire

Ali Akbor OBE DL is a housing expert in the United Kingdom. He was the Chief Executive Officer of Unity Homes and Enterprise for over two decades. At present he is a Board Member and Chair of Audit and Risk Committee at Pickering & Ferens Homes.

In 2020, he was appointed to the independent inquiry panel by the British Prime Minister after Grenfell incident. He was one of the three authors of the Grenfell Tower Inquiry Phase 2 Report, which was officially published in 2024. Akbor was awarded an Officer of the Order of the British Empire (OBE) in the 2019 New Year Honours List for his services to the community in Leeds. In 2025, Akbor was commissioned as a deputy lieutenant of Greater Manchester.
