= The Skinners' School =

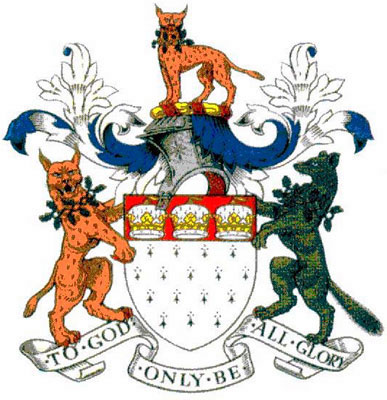

Location
- St John's Road; Royal Tunbridge Wells, Kent, TN4 9PG; England; 51.1425°N 0.261°E

Information
- Type: Grammar school
- Motto: "To God Only Be All Glory" and "In Christo Fratres"
- Established: 1887
- Founder: Worshipful Company of Skinners
- Department for Education URN: 140595 Tables
- Ofsted: Reports
- Chairman: Major General John Moore-Bick CBE DL
- Headmaster: Edward Wesson
- Gender: Boys
- Age: 11 to 18
- Enrollment: 1200+
- Houses: Sebastian, Atwell, Hunt, Knott, Nicholson (from 1/9/2017)
Colour
- Publication: The Leopard
- Former pupils: Old Skinners
- School song: "The Leopard Song"
- Website: www.skinners-school.co.uk

The Skinners' School (formally The Skinners' Company's Middle School for Boys and commonly known as Skinners') is a British grammar school with academy status for boys located in the town of Royal Tunbridge Wells, Kent, England. Established in 1887, the school was founded by the Worshipful Company of Skinners (one of the 111 livery companies of the City of London) in response to a demand for education in the region. Today Skinners' remains an all-boys grammar school, awarded specialist status in science and mathematics. The current enrolment is 1119 pupils, of whom around 326 are in the sixth form. The first headmaster was Reverend Frederick Knott, after whom Knott House is named. The current headmaster is Edward Wesson.

Skinners' boys generally take eleven GCSEs in year eleven (aged 15–16), and can study three or four A-levels in the sixth form. An Ofsted inspection in November 2021 graded The Skinners' School as "good".

== History ==
=== Foundation ===
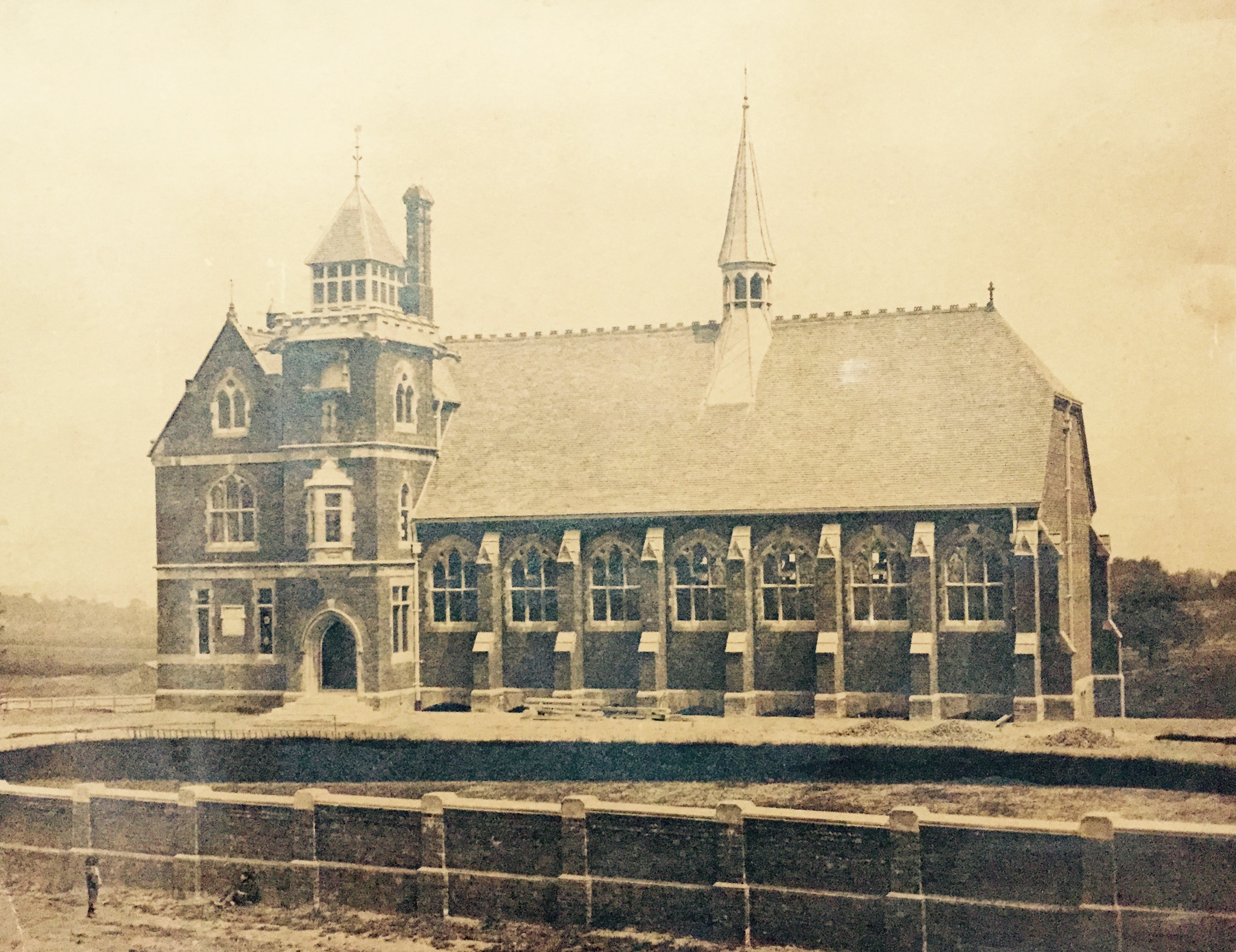
The Skinners' School following recent construction in 1886

The first school to be associated with Worshipful Company of Skinners was Tonbridge School. This 'Free Grammar School' was founded in 1553 by Andrew Judde a wealthy London fur trader and native of Tonbridge. On his death, governance of the school passed to the Skinners Company where he had been master for many years. Subsequently, the Skinners Company, like many other City Guilds, took an active interest in supporting education. For many years this took the form of charitable grants and scholarships. However, by the late nineteenth century, there was rising pressure to expand educational provision beyond that currently provided by the existing 'endowed schools' like Tonbridge and the relatively basic, local 'state national schools'. Skinners Company proposals for a second school "at Tonbridge or at some adjacent locality" first emerged in 1870, and after a prolonged row between the two towns Royal Tunbridge Wells was chosen as the location.

The school opened in October 1887 with 53 boys, many of whom had to walk in excess of six miles to reach class each day. Skinners' was maintained as a day school until 1894 when the governors allowed borders to be taken on the understanding that the total number would not exceed 50. Soon after the introduction of boarders, the first House system was created with boarders allocated to 'School House', pupils coming in from the surrounding countryside making up 'Weald House', and those living within the town divided between 'East House' and 'West House'. Skinners' has always been a selective school with entrance examinations held from the very first year in 1887 through to 1945 when the Eleven-Plus Examination was first introduced. Until the late 1940s, Skinners' was also a fee-paying school. An advert for the school in 1895 stated: "The School Fee for Day Boys, which includes tuition, books, stationery and games for boys under 11, £2 18s 4d a term, and for boys over 11, £3 10s a term".

=== Related Skinners Company Schools ===
The citizens of Tonbridge, angry at the neglect of their sons, encouraged the company to found a third school in 1888 – Sir Andrew Judd's Commercial School – which is now The Judd School. Finally, in the 1890s, The Company opened a girls school in Hackney, London, called The Skinners' Company's School for Girls.

=== The First World War ===
The School's Cadet Corps (originally referred to as the Officer Training Corps or OTC) was created in 1900. When the First World War broke out in 1914 a high proportion of these cadets joined the army as junior officers. Many joined the Queen's Own Royal West Kent Regiment which was the most closely affiliated with the Skinners' OTC, but there was also widespread school representation across many other army regiments, the navy and Royal Flying Corps, predecessor to the RAF. By the end of the war 522 Skinners' School Masters and Old Boys had served in the Armed Forces (roughly 40% of the 1200 boys who had attended the school since its foundation). Of these 89 are commemorated on the Memorial at the back of the Old School Hall having paid the ultimate sacrifice for serving their country.

=== The Second World War ===
Following the outbreak of the Second World War in 1939 the pupils of Colfe's School were evacuated from Lewisham to Tunbridge Wells and shared the Skinners' School premises for three years. Skinners' boys were taught in the mornings, Colfe's in the afternoons. The air raid shelters that were dug beneath the school still exist, but remain closed to the boys of the school. While the total number serving in the forces appears to be unrecorded, it is known that 61 Masters and Old Boys died, and are recorded alongside those from the First World War on the School memorial.

=== From fee-paying school to state grammar ===
The Skinners' School, along with the Judd School, Tunbridge Wells Girls Grammar and Tonbridge Girls Grammar, became 'free' voluntary-aided state Grammar Schools in 1948 following the Education Act 1944. This act introduced the Tripartite System defining three different types of secondary school: grammar schools, secondary technical schools and secondary modern schools.

=== Recent developments ===
The school has expanded and evolved over the years. On 1 April 1992, The school (formerly a voluntary aided grammar school) became a grant maintained school, reverting to voluntary aided status again in 1998, following the Education Reform Act of that year. A modern languages centre was completed in 2002 and a music and performing arts centre opened in 2003. Specialist science status was awarded in 2005, which resulted in refurbishment of the science block. The school has since also gained mathematics and computing specialism status, and also achieved the 'green flag' status as an ecoschool five times. The school won a teaching award in 2009 in recognition of the work completed on environmental sustainability. On 1 February 2014 the school converted to academy status.

== Buildings and Property ==
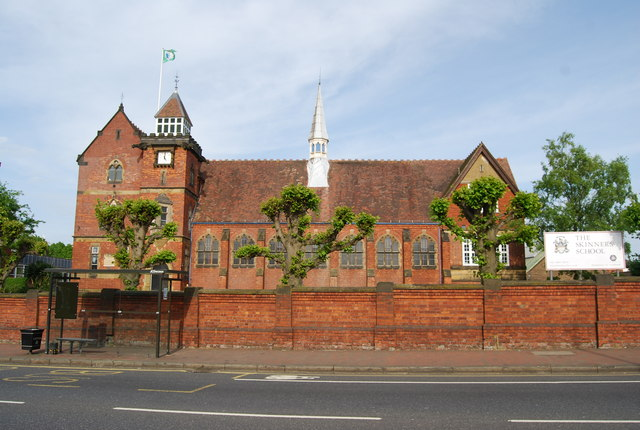
The main building

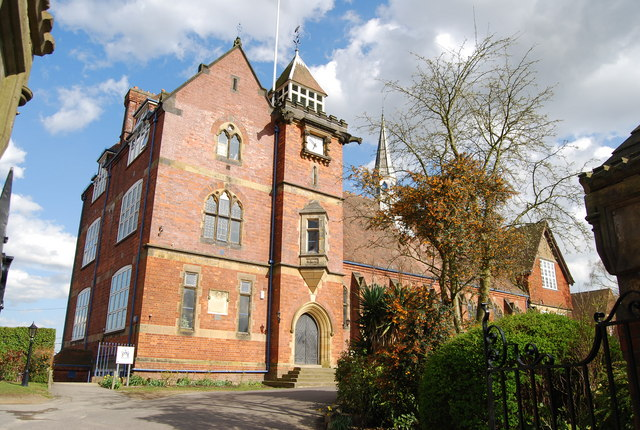
The main building

The school consists of a range of buildings built at various stages of the school's history. While each building services specific departments, these have changed as new building/facilities became available:

The Old School Hall (1887) The red-brick, Early English Gothic building facing St.Johns Road is the oldest building on the main school site. The architect, E.H. Burnell had previously designed the front-facing buildings of Tonbridge School in a similar Gothic style. The main building is entered via heavy wooden doors, and a gothic stone, entrance hall, overlooked by an oriel window, designed to provide the original headmaster with a full right and left view from his office.

The main hall is buttressed with brick and stone piers, and well lit with fourteen stone traceried windows. On the inside the central hall is 170 ft by 30 ft long, with a "noiseless" wood block floor, carved corbels along the walls and a moulded timber roof. In 1903 the School acquired a magnificent organ from St. Johns Church, which still takes pride of place, alongside a narrow stage. In this room the Skinners' School morning assembly took place for over 70 years until the building of the 'New Wing' in 1960. To the left of the entrance is the main staff room. From the entrance hall, stairs run up to a gallery overlooking the main hall, which was dubbed the Bab-el-Mandeb Straits by the boys in early days, as it defined the 'dangerous' narrow passage leading to the headmaster's office (now the Bursar's Office). To the right of this gallery are two classrooms, where the old library once stood.

Further up the clock tower is the CCF HQ, which used to be the home of the music department, but this moved once more extensive facilities became available.

The southern end of the Old School Hall now houses the art department, following the relocation of the English department to the newly constructed Mitchell Building.

Beneath and behind the main hall, a covered playground previously used for break-time football matches has been reassigned as toilet facilities.

The School House (1887) The School House was originally built as the Headmaster's residence, but given its commodious proportions, it soon doubled up as a boarding house for close to a dozen boys. It now contains administrative offices including the school reception, headmaster's and deputy headmaster's offices.

Byng Hall (1900) While the School did not acquire Byng Hall until 2003 the School had been a close supporter of St. John's Church Institute, who originally took residence in the Hall from its inauguration in 1900. Byng Hall was named after Lady Byng whose generous financial contribution had enabled the Hall to be built. Lady Byng was a direct descendant of the infamous Admiral John Byng who'd been executed in 1757 for allowing the French to take Minorca. He was a scapegoat and everyone knew it. Voltaire made a wry reference to Byng's execution in Candide, commenting that: "in this country, it is good to kill an admiral from time to time, in order to encourage the others". Given this historic injustice it was fitting that the Hall should be officially opened by another more celebrated Admiral, Charles Davis Lucas, the very first recipient of the Victoria Cross. As a young midshipman, Lucas had saved many lives though his courage and quick thinking. During the Crimean War a live shell had landed on the deck of his ship in the midst of a fierce artillery exchange with the Russians. Lucas ignored the desperate cries to take cover. Instead of hitting the deck, he ran forward, picked up the still fizzing shell, carried it to the rail and dropped it overboard a fraction of a second before it exploded with a tremendous roar. He later married Lady Byng's niece, and was no doubt more than happy to play his part in restoring the good name of the family. It fell to Skinners' first headmaster Reverend Frederick Knott to lead the vote of thanks for Admiral Lucas' heroism and the Byng family's generosity in funding the building of the Hall.

Originally the St John's Church Institute and later part of St John's Primary School, the governors of Skinners' had been hoping to purchase it for many years. It is stylistically very similar to the Main Building and School House and is viable from the front of the school plot.

Skinners' received grants from central government and ran an appeal in school and through the old boys network to raise the funds for the buildings purchase and renovation. The final building received a conservation award from the Tunbridge Wells Civic Society for the sensitive restoration which now enables Byng Hall to be used by the music and drama department; school drama productions and music recitals in The Thomson Theatre are prominent features in the school calendar.

The Old Gym (1900) The original School Gymnasium was constructed in 1900. It became too small to meet the sporting needs of the pupils and so temporarily acted as a careers office and gallery room for the art department. Until its demolition, the old changing area served as the headquarters and equipment stores for the CCF. The gym area became a new sixth form study area/common room with recreational seating and computers available to sixth form students during break/lunchtime, free periods and before/after school. There had been plans for a while to convert the old gym into an "Expressive Arts Building" with classrooms for the English department, a library and a large area for the sixth form. Eventually this came to fruition with the demolition of the Old Gym and construction of the Mitchell Building in its place.

The New Wing (1960) Due to its stark architecture, the concrete building is most out of place within the school and is often ironically referred to as The 'New' Wing. It contains the physics and chemistry laboratories and more recently now serves the biology laboratories. The laboratories were completely renovated on the school being awarded special science status in 2005 which prompted the biology department's move. New Wing also contained sixth form facilities until recently and the dining hall, which contains the canteen.

The Knox Wing (1980) The Knox Wing contains eight classrooms of very similar appearance. These serve as form rooms and also classrooms for economics, geography, history, religious studies and Politics.

The Leopard Building (1994) The Leopard Building contains dedicated rooms for design/technology. Until its move to the Old School Hall with the construction of the Mitchell Building, the art department was housed here as well. Recently it has become home to IT rooms, and the other classrooms serve as form rooms and rooms for mathematics. In 2010 the design technology rooms were upgraded to include facilities for delivering food technology.

The Cecil Beeby Building (2002) The Cecil Beeby Building, named after one of Skinners' School's long-serving headmasters, provides dedicated resources for the modern foreign language department and also provides form rooms. It was built on the site of two old cabins where German used to be taught.

The New Sports Hall (2012) The New Sports Hall was officially opened by the chair of the governing body on 9 November 2012. Inside the main hall can accommodate four badminton courts, five a side football, basketball, hockey training and cricket practice nets. At the far end it holds a large indoor climbing wall and upstairs houses a state of the art fitness suite, dance studio and classroom.

The Mitchell Building (2020) The Mitchell building is the most recent addition to the Skinners’ School site and contains the new sixth form common room; the Sinfield English Department, with five classrooms; and the New Library. The building is constructed with a red brick exterior. It has been nominated for two architecture awards.

Southfields Skinners' owns a large set of playing fields just along the main road that runs outside the school on the border of Tunbridge Wells and Southborough. Called Southfields, it was originally intended to be the site for the new school when plans were drafted in the 1930s. World War II prevented the move from occurring, but the foundations for the buildings are still present in one corner.

The fields are home to five rugby pitches, a football pitch, cricket nets, three cricket squares and various athletics facilities. The pavilion, featuring three changing rooms, was rebuilt in 2005 following an arson attack.

== Form System ==
Each year group at the school is divided into forms. In years 7 through 9 there are five forms, organised by house as assigned to the pupils on entering the school. In years 10 and 11 (KS4) the pupils are reorganised into six form groups, numbered 1 though 6. In years 10 and 11 there are separate teaching groups for the GCSE subjects that differ from the forms. In the sixth form there are seven form groups in each year, which are only used for registration and are not related to the students’ A-Level choices.

== Academic performance ==
The Skinners' School performs consistently above average and was awarded a "1 or outstanding", from Ofsted inspectors, on 6 June 2007.

=== In 2016 ===
A-Level

- 87% of entries achieved A and B grades (excluding General Studies).

GCSE

- The vast majority of candidates achieved excellent grades, with 65% of grades being at A* or A.
- The overall GCSE pass rate (5 A*-C) was 98%.

== Headmasters ==
The current headmaster is Edward Wesson.

The Reverend Frederick Knott was selected by the school governors from over 80 candidates who applied to be headmaster of the new Skinners Company's Middle School for Boys. After graduating from Magdalene College, Cambridge he taught at Dulwich College for a number of years, before taking up his first role as Skinners' School headmaster, aged 27. The following report on a speech he made at Skinners Day in 1900 provides a strong indication of the ethos he imbued the school with during its formative years.

"It was impressed upon them [the boys] the necessity of some relief from work and toil, and sports undoubtedly acted as such. It strengthened them, gave them a better constitution, and gave more power for work and better results. The School is not to be regarded as a place where many lessons were stuffed into their brains. It was a place where character was formed, where they learned to associate with friends and where they learned to be in sympathy with their thoughts and ideas. It was a preparation for a greater life."

Other past headmasters have included:

- Colin Ransford (1924–1928)
- Lieut. Colonel Walter Bye (1928–1953)
- Cecil Beeby (1953–1976), after whom the Modern Languages school block is named
- Gerald Taylor
- Peter Braggins (1991-2007)
- Simon Everson (2007–2013)
- Edward Wesson (2013–)

== See also ==
- The Judd School
- Tunbridge Wells Girls Grammar School
- Tunbridge Wells Grammar School for Boys
- The Skinners' Kent Academy
- Worshipful Company of Skinners
