= BrexitCentral =

Former news website

BrexitCentral was a pro-Brexit news website founded by Matthew Eliott. It was active from 2016 to 2020.

The website described its mission as "promoting a positive vision of Britain after Brexit". According to BuzzFeed News, "five of the site's seven staff members explicitly worked on the Vote Leave campaign, while its registered headquarters is in the same building as the campaign's was." By 2018, the website's offices were reported to be located in Millbank Tower, London. Its first editor was Jonathan Isaby, who previously worked as co-editor of ConservativeHome and Political Director of the TaxPayers’ Alliance. Isaby wrote for ConservativeHome in 2016 that "the establishment of BrexitCentral by the ever entrepreneurial Matthew Elliott, who headed the Vote Leave campaign and now returns to the helm of Business for Britain, is about giving those more than 17.4 million people a voice".

The website also employed former Vote Leave employee Darren Grimes. Former Vote Leave staffer Shahmir Sanni has described the site as "part of a network of rightwing thinktanks – including the Institute of Economic Affairs, the Adam Smith Institute, BrexitCentral and others – that have the ears of cabinet ministers and MPs". These groups are all connected to 55 and 57 Tufton Street in Westminster, London, where "regular think tank meetings are chaired jointly by staff from the pro-Brexit website Brexit Central and low-tax campaigners the TaxPayers’ Alliance (TPA)", according to OpenDemocracy. The Guardian included BrexitCentral among a group of "ultra free market thinktanks [which] have gained exceptional access to the heart of Boris Johnson’s government."

In 2017 it was reported that the website had been granted lobby passes, granting their employees access to parliamentary briefings. "It is pretty disturbing to see what is essentially continuity Vote Leave being given unfettered access to parliament," Labour's Stephen Kinnock told Buzzfeed.

In 2019, the BBC reported that a claim by BrexitCentral that all EU countries would be forced to adopt the Euro after 2020 was false.

Writers for the website have included Claire Ainsley, former head of the Joseph Rowntree Foundation, and current Labour Party policy chief under Sir Keir Starmer. She wrote for the website in November 2016 that "Brexit presents us with the opportunity to transform the prospects of many who voted Leave".

The website shut down in January 2020, as the UK finalised its Withdrawal Agreement from the European Union. Leftover funding for the website was used to award two £10,000 grants to young policymakers, "for a project which would make a meaningful contribution to the battle of ideas," according to Matthew Eliot. One of the prizes was awarded to Chris Barnard and the leadership of the British Conservation Alliance, the second to Dr Richard Johnson, Lecturer in US Politics at Queen Mary University of London.
