= Maurice Kay =

British judge

The Right Honourable Sir Maurice Kay PC

Vice President of the Civil Division of the Court of Appeal
- In office 6 May 2010 – 1 October 2014
- Preceded by: Lord Justice Waller
- Succeeded by: Lord Justice Moore-Bick

Lord Justice of Appeal
- In office 14 January 2004 – 1 November 2014

Personal details
- Born: 6 December 1942 (age 83)
- Education: University of Sheffield
- Occupation: Judge

Sir Maurice Ralph Kay PC (born 6 December 1942) is a retired member of the Court of Appeal of England and Wales.

Kay was educated at William Hulme's Grammar School in Manchester and the University of Sheffield

Kay was called to the Bar in 1975 (Gray's Inn) and was elected a bencher in 1995. He became a Queen's Counsel and was appointed a Recorder in 1988. He was appointed to the High Court on 17 January 1995, receiving the customary knighthood.

He was assigned to the Queen's Bench Division, serving on the Employment Appeal Tribunal from June 1995. He was Presiding Judge of the Chester Circuit from 1996 to 1999, and was appointed Judge in Charge of the Administrative Court in 2002.

On 14 January 2004, Kay became a Lord Justice of Appeal, and was appointed to the Privy Council on 11 February of that year. He served as President of the Judicial Studies Board from July 2007 to July 2010, and began a three-year term as Vice-President of the Court of Appeal (Civil Division) on 6 May 2010.

Kay is an honorary fellow of Robinson College, Cambridge.

== See also ==
- List of Lords Justices of Appeal
