= Martin Moore-Bick =

British judge (born 1946)

The Right Honourable Sir Martin Moore-Bick

Vice President of the Civil Division of the Court of Appeal
- In office 1 October 2014 – 7 December 2016
- Preceded by: Lord Justice Maurice Kay
- Succeeded by: Lady Justice Gloster

Deputy Head of Civil Justice
- In office 1 January 2007 – 31 December 2012
- Preceded by: Lord Justice Dyson
- Succeeded by: Lord Justice Richards

Lord Justice of Appeal
- In office 7 April 2005 – 7 December 2016

Personal details
- Born: 6 December 1946 (age 79) Wales
- Spouse: Tessa Gee (m. 1974)
- Children: 4
- Relatives: John Moore-Bick (brother)
- Education: Christ's College, Cambridge

Sir Martin James Moore-Bick, PC (born 6 December 1946) is a retired judge of the Court of Appeal of England and Wales.

== Early and private life ==
Moore-Bick was born in Wales, the son of John Ninian Moore-Bick and his wife Kathleen (née Beall). His younger brother, John Moore-Bick, is a retired major-general in the British Army.

Moore-Bick was educated at The Skinners' School, Tunbridge Wells, and Christ's College, Cambridge, of which he became an honorary fellow in 2009.

Moore-Bick married Tessa Gee in 1974. They have four children: two sons and two daughters.

== Legal career ==
Moore-Bick was called to the Bar at Inner Temple in 1969, and was elected a bencher in 1992, serving as treasurer in 2015.

Moore-Bick practised as a barrister from chambers at 3 Essex Court, later 20 Essex Street. His practice was in commercial law and, in particular, shipping law. He became a Queen's Counsel in 1986 and was appointed a Recorder in 1990. He was appointed to the High Court on 2 October 1995, receiving the customary knighthood. He was assigned to the Queen's Bench Division, serving in the Commercial Court.

On 7 April 2005, Moore-Bick became a Lord Justice of Appeal, and he was appointed to the Privy Council on 7 June of that year. In the same year, he was appointed to the role of chairman of the Legal Services Consultative Panel, serving until 2009.

Moore-Bick served as Deputy Head of Civil Justice from 1 January 2007 to 31 December 2012. Lord Justice Richards took over this role from 1 January 2013 for an initial three-year period. From 1 October 2014 until his retirement, Moore-Bick was Vice President of the Civil Division of the Court of Appeal. He took over the role on the retirement of Lord Justice Maurice Kay.

Moore-Bick retired from judicial office on 6 December 2016. According to his Chambers' website, on 14 August 2017, "He now accepts appointments as an arbitrator."

== Grenfell Tower fire public inquiry ==
It was announced on 29 June 2017 that Moore-Bick would lead a public inquiry into the Grenfell Tower fire. On 29 and 30 June it was widely reported that the tenants' solicitor in a 2014 case against Westminster City Council had said, after Moore-Bick's ruling, that it gave "the green light for social-cleansing of the poor on a mass scale". The local Labour MP, Emma Dent Coad, said on 4 July that year that local people had no confidence in Moore-Bick and that he should stand down.

On 25 July, at the second public meeting held by the Inquiry before finalisation of its terms of reference, Moore-Bick faced further calls for his resignation, many residents saying that he did not represent them. In response, Moore-Bick said that he was qualified to lead the investigation, because in his 20 years as a judge, he had looked into "the sort of problems that have to be considered in relation to this fire." He promised that the Inquiry would consider the deregulation of fire safety standards, as well as the multi-million pound refurbishment to Grenfell Tower. "We are going to investigate and find the facts in relation to the whole course of events," he said.

The 1,000-page first stage of the report on the Inquiry was formally published on 30 October 2019.

== Decided cases ==
- Hall v Woolston Hall Leisure Ltd [2000] EWCA Civ 170, illegality principle in employment
- Peekay Intermark Ltd v Australia and New Zealand Banking Group Ltd [2006] EWCA Civ 386 [43] supporting a strict signature rule in English contract law
- Edwards v Chesterfield Royal Hospital NHS Foundation Trust [2010] EWCA Civ 571, supporting a doctor's damages claim
- Jivraj v Hashwani [2010] EWCA Civ 712, upholding an arbitrator's discrimination claim
- Shumba v Park Cakes Ltd [2013] EWCA Civ 974

== See also ==
- List of Lords Justices of Appeal
