= Grenfell United =

Social activist group of Grenfell Tower fire survivors

Grenfell United is a pressure group made up of the families of victims and survivors of the 2017 Grenfell Tower fire. The first formal meeting of Grenfell United took place on Saturday 24 June 2017. The minutes read: “Residents are not present as individuals. They must organise and they must establish a structure.” They had been convened by Father McTernan, a local Irish priest, who had worked for decades in conflict resolution.

The governments first response was to try and set up a rival group, chaired by one who had no blood relative living in the tower. This failed and they started to correspond with the group- though to avoid responding. Eventually meetings were set up in the House of Commons, with a changing group of ministers. Little progress was made. Mr Mussilhy, the vice chairman said "It's quite insulting at times to see any time Grenfell is spoken about in Parliament there's no more than 6-7 MPs in the room."

Grenfell United is campaigning for a social housing regulator, that will ensure tenants are heard when they raise concerns, and for all dangerous materials including cladding to be banned and removed from homes.

== Second anniversary protest ==
On the night of 12 June 2019, the group projected a 12-storey message onto tower blocks that still have lethal cladding. As of May, just 13 out of 176 private residential buildings at risk had had ACM cladding removed and replaced. There were projections on Cruddas House, Newcastle, which said "2 years after Grenfell and the fire doors in this building still don't work", NV building in Salford which said "2 years after Grenfell and this building is still covered in dangerous cladding" and Frinstead House in Kensington which said "2 years after Grenfell and this building still has no sprinklers."
