= Tenant management organisation =

Housing (Right to Manage) Regulations 1994
- Statutory Instrument
- Parliament of the United Kingdom
- Citation: SI 1994/627
- Territorial extent: England and Wales

Dates
- Made: 7 March 1994
- Laid before Parliament: 11 March 1994
- Commencement: 1 April 1994
- Revoked: 1 October 2008 (England only)
Other legislation
Made under	Housing Act 1985
Revoked by	Housing (Right to Manage) (England) Regulations 2008 (England only)

Status: Amended

Text of statute as originally enacted

Housing (Right to Manage) (England) Regulations 2008
- Statutory Instrument
- Parliament of the United Kingdom
- Citation: SI 2008/2361
- Territorial extent: England

Dates
- Made: 4 September 2008
- Laid before Parliament: 10 September 2008
- Commencement: 1 October 2008
- Revoked: 6 August 2012
Other legislation
Repeals/revokes	Housing (Right to Manage) Regulations 1994 (England only)
Made under	Housing Act 1985
Revoked by	Housing (Right to Manage) (England) Regulations 2012

Status: Revoked

Text of statute as originally enacted

Housing (Right to Manage) (England) Regulations 2012
- Statutory Instrument
- Parliament of the United Kingdom
- Citation: SI 2012/1821
- Territorial extent: England

Dates
- Made: 10 July 2012
- Laid before Parliament: 13 July 2012
- Commencement: 6 August 2012
Other legislation
Repeals/revokes	Housing (Right to Manage) (England) Regulations 2008
Made under	Housing Act 1985

Status: Current legislation

Text of statute as originally enacted

A tenant management organisation (TMO) is an organisation set up under the UK Government's Housing (Right to Manage) Regulations 1994 (SI 1994/627) (or its 2008 and 2012 successor instruments in relation to England), which gives residents of council housing homes in England and Wales the statutory right to take over responsibility for the running of their homes. Tenants of housing association homes do not have a right to establish a tenant management organisation but may establish one under a voluntary route with the agreement of the landlord.

The equivalent entity in Scotland is a tenant management co-operative, as defined in section 55 of the Housing (Scotland) Act 2001.

== Structure and operation ==
A TMO is created when residents (tenants and leaseholders) in a defined area of council homes create a corporate body and, typically, elect a management committee to run the body. This body then enters into a formal legal contract between the landlord of the home(s) and the council, known as the management agreement. This agreement outlines the services a TMO is responsible for and what services the council is responsible for. The services provided by TMOs are funded by the management allowances paid by the Council under the agreement. Such allowances should approximate to the sums the landlord would have spent to deliver the services had they remained under the direct provision of the landlord. They may therefore differ between TMOs who fall under different council landlords.

Before any management agreement can be approved by government, the TMO must be approved as competent via an independent assessment overseen by the Ministry of Housing, Communities and Local Government (MHCLG) which holds an approved list of assessors capable of undertaking such an assessment.

The TMO must also "win" a ballot of residents in the area concerned. This must secure a majority of residents overall and a majority of secure tenants. Such a ballot must be held every 5 years during the life of the TMO.

The management agreement details the services which are to be managed by the TMO on behalf of the landlord. The extent of the devolution in service can vary enormously, particularly between small and large TMOs, but may typically include day-to-day repairs, allocations and lettings, tenancy management, cleaning and care taking and rent collection/recovery. The precise detail as to which organisation undertakes which service (or part of a service) has, since 2005, been contained in the accompanying Schedules to the Management Agreement. This was separated from the body of the management agreement in 2005 to allow for policies and procedures to be more easily updated.

The TMO can take a number of legal forms. Registered TMOs may be a co-operative, or set up under corporate law.

Some 'guide TMOs' provide support to community groups interested in the concept (Friday Hill TMO and Millbank Estate TMO are two examples in London). The work of a TMO may touch and overlap with that of an arms-length management organisation (ALMO).

Independent research is limited as to the effectiveness of tenant management but studies by The Office of The Deputy Prime Minister (ODPM) published in 2002 (Tenants Managing - An Evaluation of Tenant Management Organisations in England and by Rachael Newton & Professor Rebecca Tunstall for Urban Forum (Lessons For Localism:Tenant Self-Management) in 2012, support the case for devolving control of management functions to residents at a local level. An Evaluation of English Social Housing Policy 1975-2000 states "All the studies of tenant management in local authority stock have found that they offered a quality housing service, spent less than local authorities on management and maintenance, but obtained significantly higher levels of tenant satisfaction."

== Setting up a TMO ==
The London Borough of Hackney council website states the following as a possible plan to set up a TMO:

1. Explore the options for involvement
2. Right to manage notice
3. Develop business plan training and negotiations
4. Competence assessment
5. Offer to tenants and then ballot
6. Setting up and going live

If a TMO is set up, the existing tenants or leaseholders of the council retain that status and their existing rights are protected.

== Examples of tenant management organisations in England ==
- Holland Rise & Whitebeam TMO (LB Lambeth)
- Bushbury Hill EMB (Wolverhampton CC)
- Browning EMA (LB Southwark)
- Redbrick TMO (LB Islington)
- Leathermarket JMB (LB Southwark)
- Bloomsbury EMB (Birmingham CC)
- Millbank Estate (City of Westminster)
- Belle Isle TMO(Leeds CC)
