= Aftermath of the Grenfell Tower fire =

Series of events following the Grenfell Tower fire in 2017

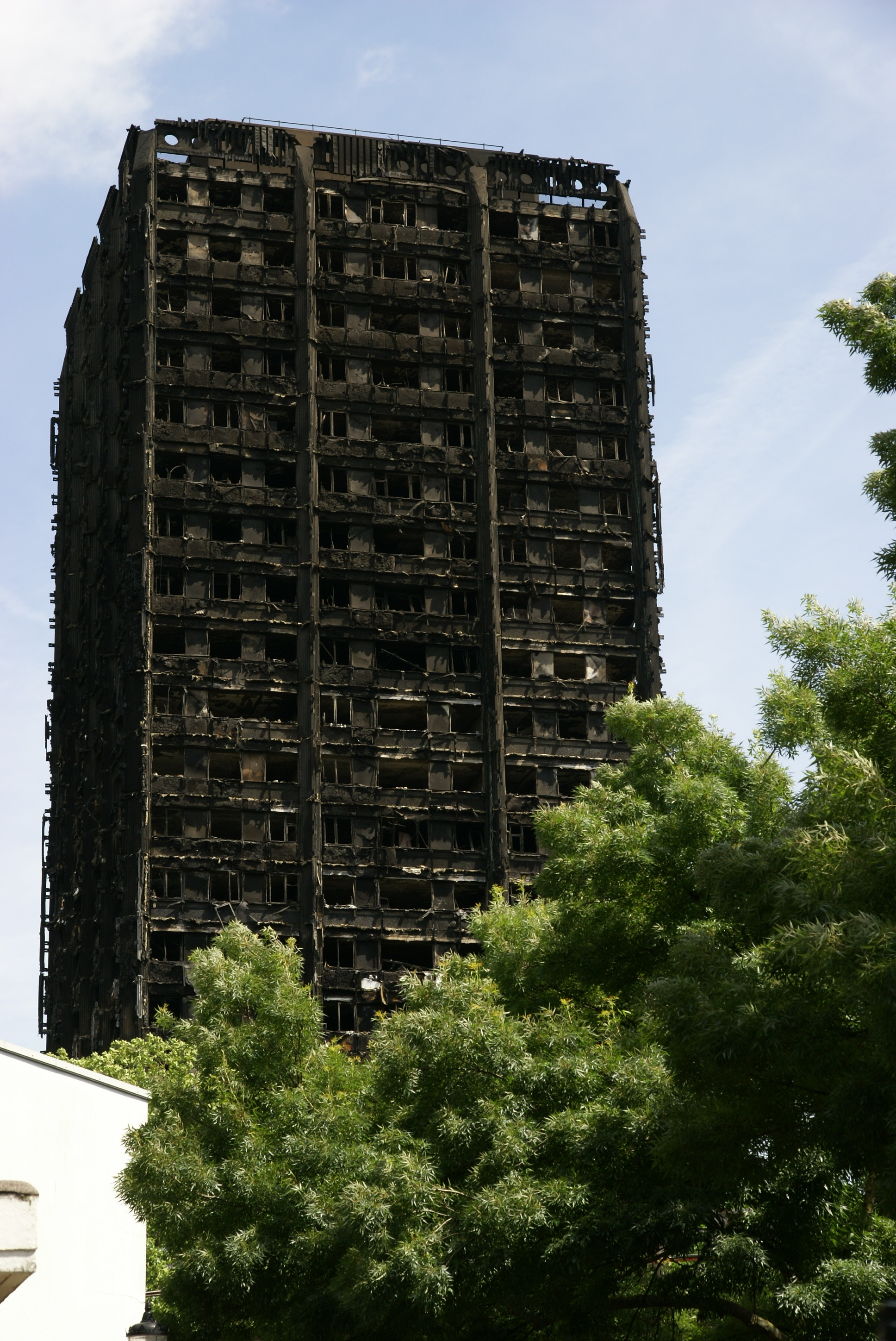
- Grenfell Tower two days after the fire broke out

- Grenfell Tower (Royal Borough of Kensington and Chelsea) Grenfell Tower (Greater London) Grenfell Tower (the United Kingdom)
- Date: 14 June 2017; 9 years ago
- Time: 00:54 BST (first emergency call)
- Duration: 24 hours (under control); Over 60 hours (fully extinguished)
- Location: Grenfell Tower, North Kensington, London, United Kingdom; 51.5140°N 0.2158°W; TQ 23907 80957
- Type: Structure fire
- Cause: Electrical fault in a refrigerator; spread of fire largely exacerbated by flammable exterior cladding on the building
- Outcome: Government taskforce taking over parts of the RBKC council function; Urgent fire safety tests on cladding from similar towers; Independent review of building regulations and fire safety commissioned; £200 Million pledged from Government to replace similar cladding in other residential towers in England
- Deaths: 72
- Injuries: 74 hospitalised
- Property damage: £200 million – £1 billion (estimated)
- Inquiries: Public inquiry hearings opened 14 September 2017
- Inquest: Open for all 72 victims; pending police investigation and public inquiry
- Arrests: 6
- Website: www.grenfelltowerinquiry.org.uk

On 14 June 2017, the Grenfell Tower fire broke out in the 24-storey Grenfell Tower block of flats in North Kensington, West London, at 00:54 BST; it caused 72 deaths, including those of two victims who later died in hospital. More than 70 others were injured and 223 people escaped. It was the deadliest structural fire in the United Kingdom since the 1988 Piper Alpha disaster and the worst UK residential fire since the Second World War.

The fire is currently being investigated by the police, a public inquiry, and coroner's inquests. Among the issues being investigated are the management of the building by Kensington and Chelsea London Borough Council and Kensington and Chelsea TMO (Tenant Management Organisation, which was responsible for the borough's council housing) and the responses of London Fire Brigade, the council and other government agencies. In the aftermath of the fire, the council's leader, deputy leader and chief executive resigned, and the council took direct control of council housing from the TMO. The national government commissioned an independent review of building regulations and fire safety, which published a report in May 2018. Across the UK and in some other countries, local governments have investigated other tower blocks to find others that have similar cladding. Efforts to replace the cladding on these buildings are ongoing.

The Grenfell Tower Inquiry began on 14 September 2017 to investigate the causes of the fire and other related issues. Findings from the first report of the inquiry were released in October 2019 and addressed the events of the night. It affirmed that the exterior did not comply with building regulations and was the central reason why the fire spread, and that the fire service were too late in advising residents to evacuate. A second phase to investigate the broader causes began in 2020.

== Short-term ==
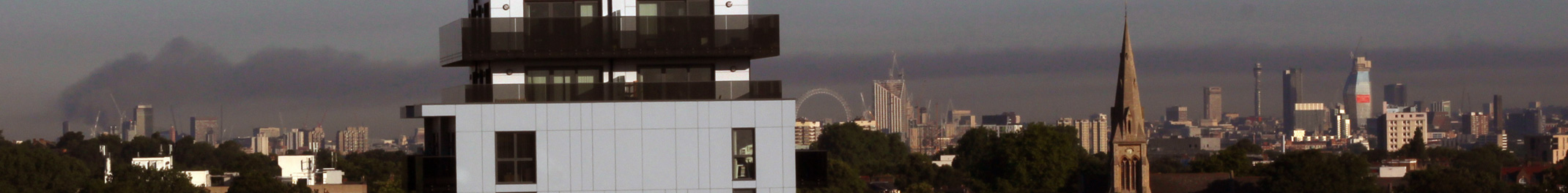
A smoke trail was visible across London, stretching several miles east

The fire's proximity to Latimer Road Underground station caused a partial closure of London Underground's Hammersmith & City and Circle lines. The A40 Westway was closed in both directions. Bus routes were diverted. Services on the Hammersmith & City, and Circle lines were again suspended on 17 June 2017 due to concerns regarding falling debris.

A total of 151 homes were destroyed in the tower and surrounding area. People from surrounding buildings were evacuated due to concerns that the tower might collapse.

The Kensington Aldridge Academy, at the base of Grenfell Tower and inside the police cordon, was closed for more than a year after the fire. Students were temporarily relocated to different local schools for lessons, GCSE and A-Level exams. On the morning of the fire, 56 students attended a maths exam. By 18 September 2017, a temporary school in Scrubs Lane had been built by Portakabin in 12 weeks. The school had returned to its original site by 6 September 2018.

The City of London cancelled the annual Mansion House Dinner, hosted by the Lord Mayor of London due to take place the day after the fire. Philip Hammond, the Chancellor of the Exchequer, had been due to address the event, but had said he would not do so following the fire.

The fire also severely affected three low-rise "finger blocks" adjoining Grenfell Tower. Their residents were evacuated due to the fire. The blocks, Barandon Walk, Testerton Walk and Hurstway Walk, also lost access to hot water as they shared a boiler beneath Grenfell Tower that was destroyed in the fire. On 22 October 2018, James Brokenshire published a written reply to Parliament indicating that many of the households affected were still in temporary accommodation and required rehousing.

== Community response ==
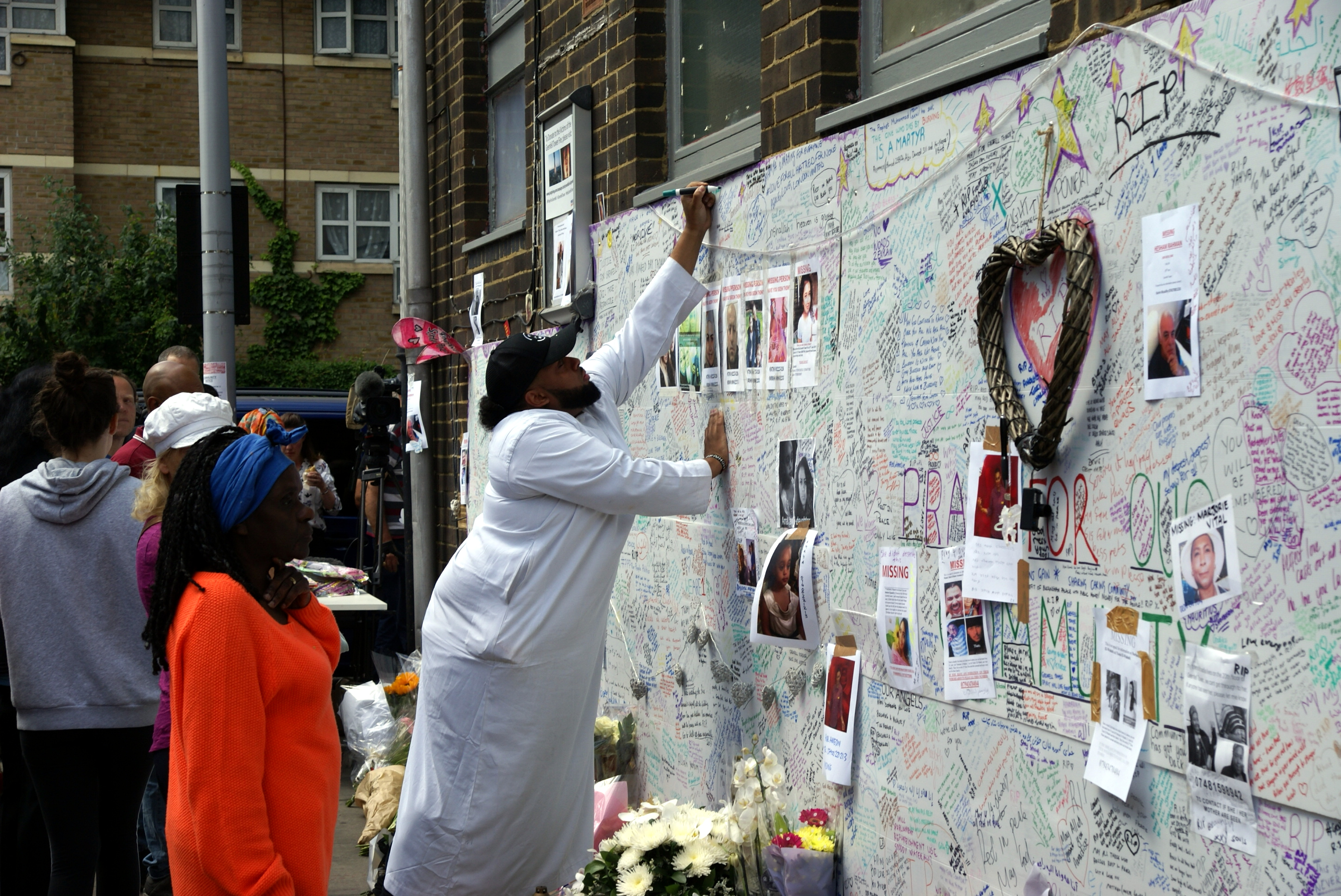
Wall of tributes to the fire victims in the nearby Bramley Road

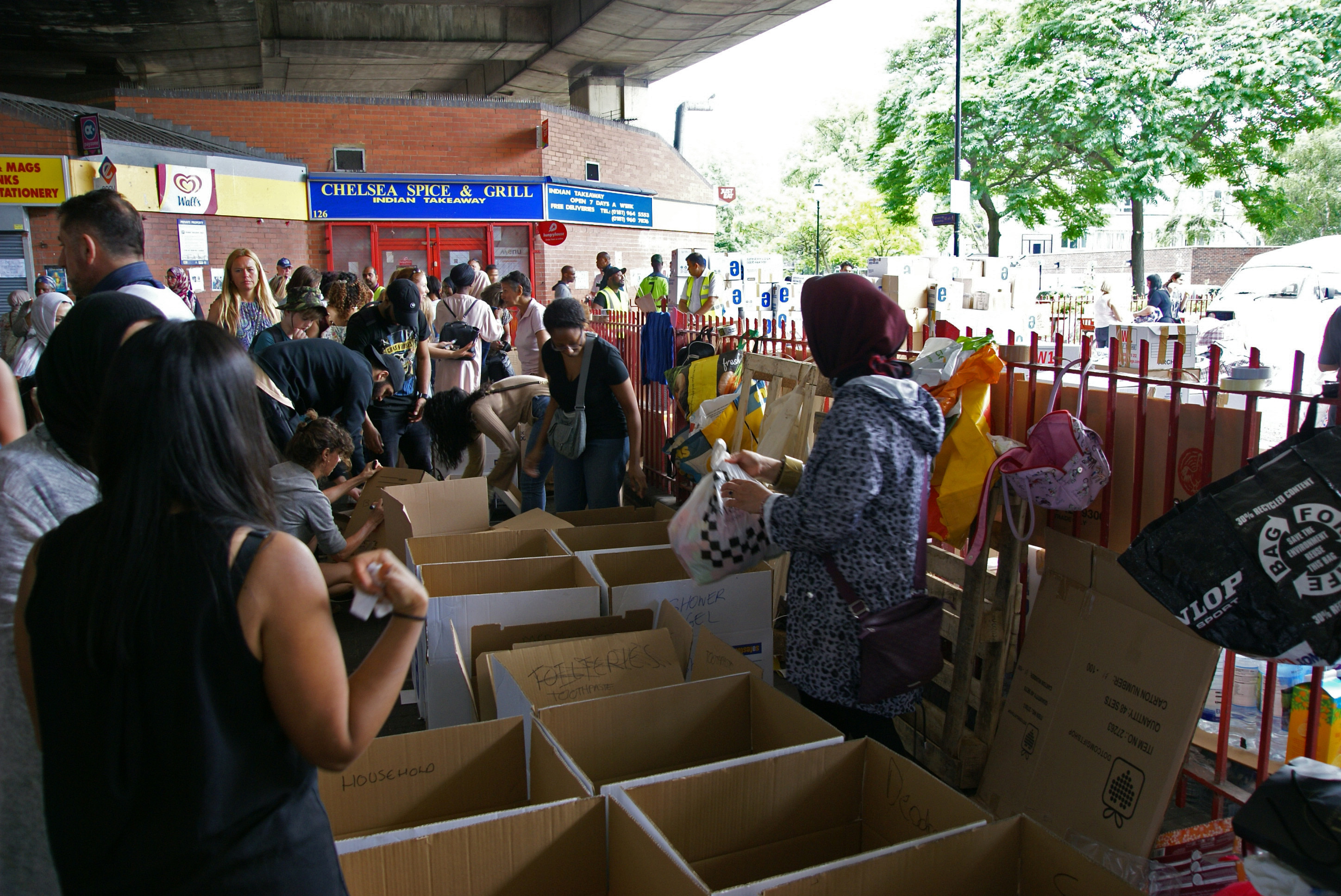
Volunteers sorting public donations for the fire victims

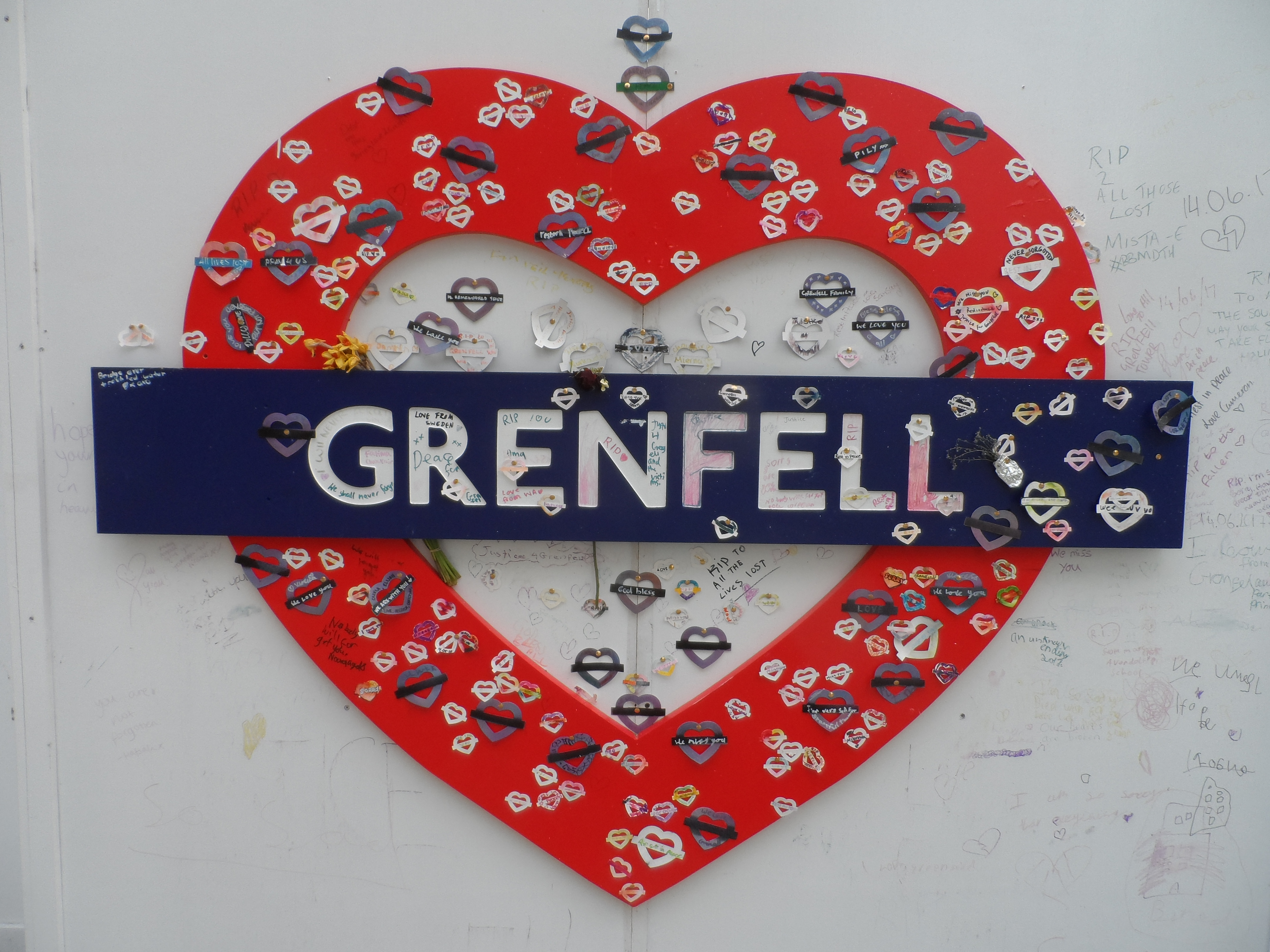
Memorial wall near Kensington Leisure Centre in May 2018

People in the immediate area and from across London rallied to assist victims of the fire. Donations of food, water, toys, and clothes were made. St Clement's Church, Treadgold Street and St James' Church, Norlands, in the Deanery of Kensington, provided shelter for people evacuated from their homes, as did nearby mosques and temples.

Several churches on Notting Hill participated in relief funding. The Methodist Church near Grenfell tower became a focus of tributes and held regular vigils for the victims. St Sava's parish offered hall space and raised £2700 for the victims.

Nearby Queens Park Rangers F.C. offered their Loftus Road venue as a relief centre and accepted donations of food, drink and clothing from the local community, and other nearby football clubs Brentford and Fulham also offered their stadiums as relief centres.

== Government response ==
The Prime Minister, Theresa May, said she was saddened and called for a cross-government meeting, and a meeting with the Civil Contingencies Secretariat.

May made a private visit to Grenfell Tower to speak with London Fire Brigade commissioner Dany Cotton and other members of the emergency services, though not with any survivors. Following this, she announced a full public inquiry into the fire. On the same day, the government issued information including details of a dedicated benefits line and a fund to support the survivors. The government confirmed Bellwin scheme financial assistance would be available to the council.

May made a visit to some of the victims at the Chelsea and Westminster Hospital. On a second visit that day, May visited St Clement's Church which had been set up as a relief centre. From there she announced a £5 million fund for victims of the fire and promised that residents would be given new housing, as close to Grenfell Tower as possible, "as far as possible within the borough, or in neighbouring boroughs", within the next three weeks. Some people proceeded to shout "coward", "murderer" and "shame on you" at her. Minor scuffles broke out.

On 18 June 2017, an announcement followed that all those made homeless would receive £5,500, with each household to be given at least £500 in cash and £5,000 paid into an account.

The government also announced details of how the £5 million fund would be spent. This included funds to support people in temporary accommodation, a discretionary fund to help with funeral costs, and funding to help with residents' legal representation. An extra £1.5 million was promised for emergency services' mental health support.

The same day, Theresa May said in the House of Commons that there had been a "failure of the state – local and national – to help people when they needed it most", adding, "As Prime Minister, I apologise for that failure. As Prime Minister I have taken responsibility for doing what we can to put things right. That is why each family whose home was destroyed is receiving a down payment from the emergency fund so they can buy food, clothes and other essentials. And all those who have lost their homes will be rehoused within three weeks."

A national minute's silence was held at 11.00am on 19 June 2017.

On 22 June 2017, Theresa May stated in the House of Commons that anyone affected by the tragedy, regardless of their immigration status, would be entitled to support, including healthcare services and accommodation. No immigration checks would be performed on those affected. (Two weeks later the government said that anyone coming forward would be subject to normal immigration rules, including the possibility of deportation, after twelve months.) May added that it was important for those receiving payments from the fund to understand that they could keep the money – they would not have to pay it back, and it would not impact their entitlement to any other benefits.

May said that further residential buildings with flammable cladding of the type used in Grenfell Tower had been identified.

In August 2017, it was announced that the Kensington and Chelsea TMO (KCTMO) would no longer manage the Lancaster Estate containing Grenfell Tower, which would come under direct council control. The next month, it was announced that the contract with KCTMO to maintain social housing in the borough had been terminated.

== Grenfell Fire Response Team (GRT) ==
On 15 June, the Council invoked the help of other London boroughs to support the survivors. Some claimed that the initial response to the disaster had been inadequate but O'Hagan's investigation contradicts this description. Responsibility was handed over to the Grenfell Fire Response Team (GRT) led by a group of chief executives from councils across London. John Barradell, chief executive of the City of London Corporation, is leading the response team. Resources available to them include: central government, the British Red Cross, the Metropolitan Police, the London Fire Brigade and local government in London. Neighbouring councils sent in staff to improve the rehousing response.

The government also announced that they would send in a task force to take over some of Kensington and Chelsea London Borough Council's functions when the GRT is gradually wound down. This move from the government stops short of demands from the London mayor, who called for ministers to appoint external commissioners to take over the running of the whole council.

== Other reactions ==
=== 14 June ===
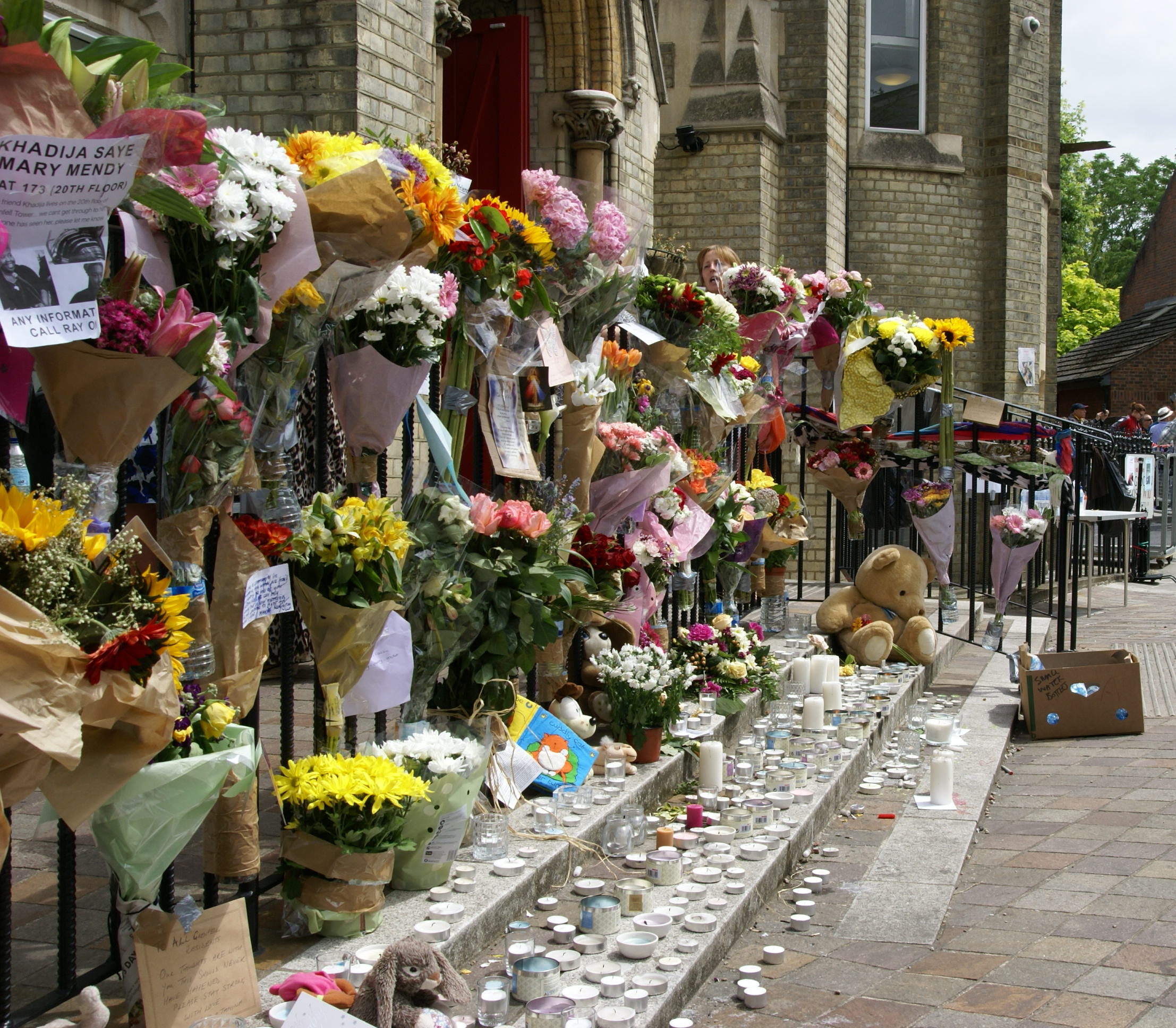
Floral tribute outside Notting Hill Methodist Church

The Grenfell Action Group posting a message on its website that highlighted their earlier warnings:

Regular readers of this blog will know that we have posted numerous warnings in recent years about the very poor fire safety standards at Grenfell Tower and elsewhere in RBKC. ALL OUR WARNINGS FELL ON DEAF EARS and we predicted that a catastrophe like this was inevitable and just a matter of time.

The Queen said that her thoughts and prayers were with the affected families. The Mayor of London Sadiq Khan issued a statement saying he was devastated and also praising the emergency services on the scene. Labour Party leader Jeremy Corbyn praised the emergency services for their actions, but said that questions needed to be answered about the fire and that land would have to be appropriated from the surrounding region. The Bishop of Kensington, Graham Tomlin, went to the site fire in the morning and counselled firefighters moving in and out of the building. In the afternoon, he spent his time with survivors and also helped collect charity donations in various churches around his parish.

=== 16 June ===
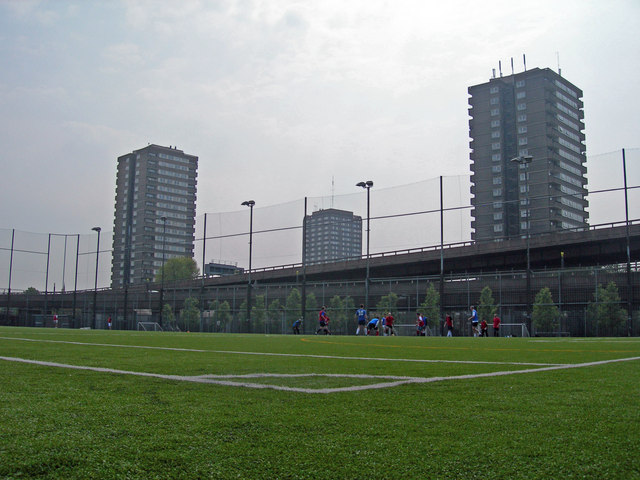
Westway Sports Centre, seen in 2007, with Grenfell Tower (centre) in the distance

The Queen and Prince William visited the Westway Sports Centre, where a relief centre had been set up to help the victims of the fire.

Jeremy Corbyn visited a nearby community centre and spoke to some of the volunteers who were helping those affected by the fire. He called for private property to be "requisitioned if necessary", to provide homes for those displaced by the fire, referring to the large number of empty properties in Kensington. This proposal was characterised by The Telegraph as unlawful. In a survey, 59% of those polled by YouGov supported Corbyn's proposal.

During the afternoon of 16 June 2017, hundreds of people protested at Kensington Town Hall, demanding that victims be rehoused within the borough and that funds be made available for those rendered homeless. The actions of some protesters caused a number of council officials to be evacuated from the Town Hall.

=== 17 June ===
On her Official Birthday, the Queen released a statement in which she said it was "difficult to escape a very sombre national mood" following the Grenfell Tower fire, and terrorist attacks in London and Manchester shortly before. She led a minute's silence at the annual Trooping the Colour ceremony held at Horse Guards Parade. May met with victims at 10 Downing Street. BBC Two cancelled transmission of the documentary Venice Biennale: Sink or Swim, scheduled for 7.30pm that evening, as it features artist Khadija Saye, who was killed in the fire, and BBC One rescheduled an edition of its new series Pitch Battle because the programme contained themes and song lyrics deemed to be inappropriate so soon after the fire.

=== 18 June ===
Responsibility for managing the aftermath of the fire was removed from Kensington and Chelsea London Borough Council. It was transferred to a new body comprising representatives from central and other local London government, the London Fire Brigade, Metropolitan Police and Red Cross. Residents living near the tower, who had been evacuated and were also effectively homeless, accused the council's leadership of going into hiding. Some families reportedly returned home after being told that rehoming priorities were aimed at those who had lived in Grenfell Tower, amid confusion and uncertainty over whether their homes were safe.

=== 21 June ===
The chief executive of Kensington and Chelsea London Borough Council, Nicholas Holgate, resigned. Holgate said he had been asked to leave by the local government secretary Sajid Javid; the government initially refuted this (Holgate was replaced by Lewisham Council CEO, Barry Quirk, on 22 June 2017).

=== 23 June ===
The 2017 Glastonbury Festival opened with a minute's silence for the victims of the Grenfell tower fire and the Manchester Arena bombing, led by Peter Hook, co-founder of Manchester band Joy Division. Camden London Borough Council ordered the evacuation of all 800 flats of the five blocks on the Chalcots Estate following an inspection of the cladding on the buildings. Celotex Saint Gobain announced on its website that it was to stop the supply of RS5000 for use in rainscreen cladding systems in buildings over 18 metres (59 ft) tall.

The Football Association announced that proceeds from the 2017 FA Community Shield match, between London rivals Arsenal and Chelsea, would be donated to support the victims.

=== 30 June ===
Conservative leader of Kensington and Chelsea London Borough Council, Nicholas Paget-Brown, announced his resignation.

== Charity fundraising ==
Music producer Simon Cowell, a borough resident, arranged the recording of a charity single of Simon & Garfunkel's "Bridge over Troubled Water" at nearby Sarm West Studios. More than fifty artists contributed to the single, which was released under the title Artists for Grenfell on 21 June 2017. It sold 120,000 copies in its first day, the highest volume of opening-day sales of the 2010s, and reached number one on the UK Singles Chart on 23 June 2017. The choir, conducted by Gareth Malone, included residents from Grenfell Tower.

On 2 September 2017, the Game 4 Grenfell football match took place to raise money for those affected. It was held at Loftus Road, the home ground of Queens Park Rangers and only a mile away from the tower. It featured a line-up of professional footballers, celebrities, firefighters and survivors.

On 17 September 2017, a benefit classical concert was held at Cadogan Hall, raising money for two charities liaising with Grenfell residents. Over 150 artists performed.

Meghan Markle, Duchess of Sussex, worked with survivors of the fire to create Together: Our Community Cookbook to raise funds for the Hubb Community Kitchen that cooked meals for survivors.

== Commemorations ==
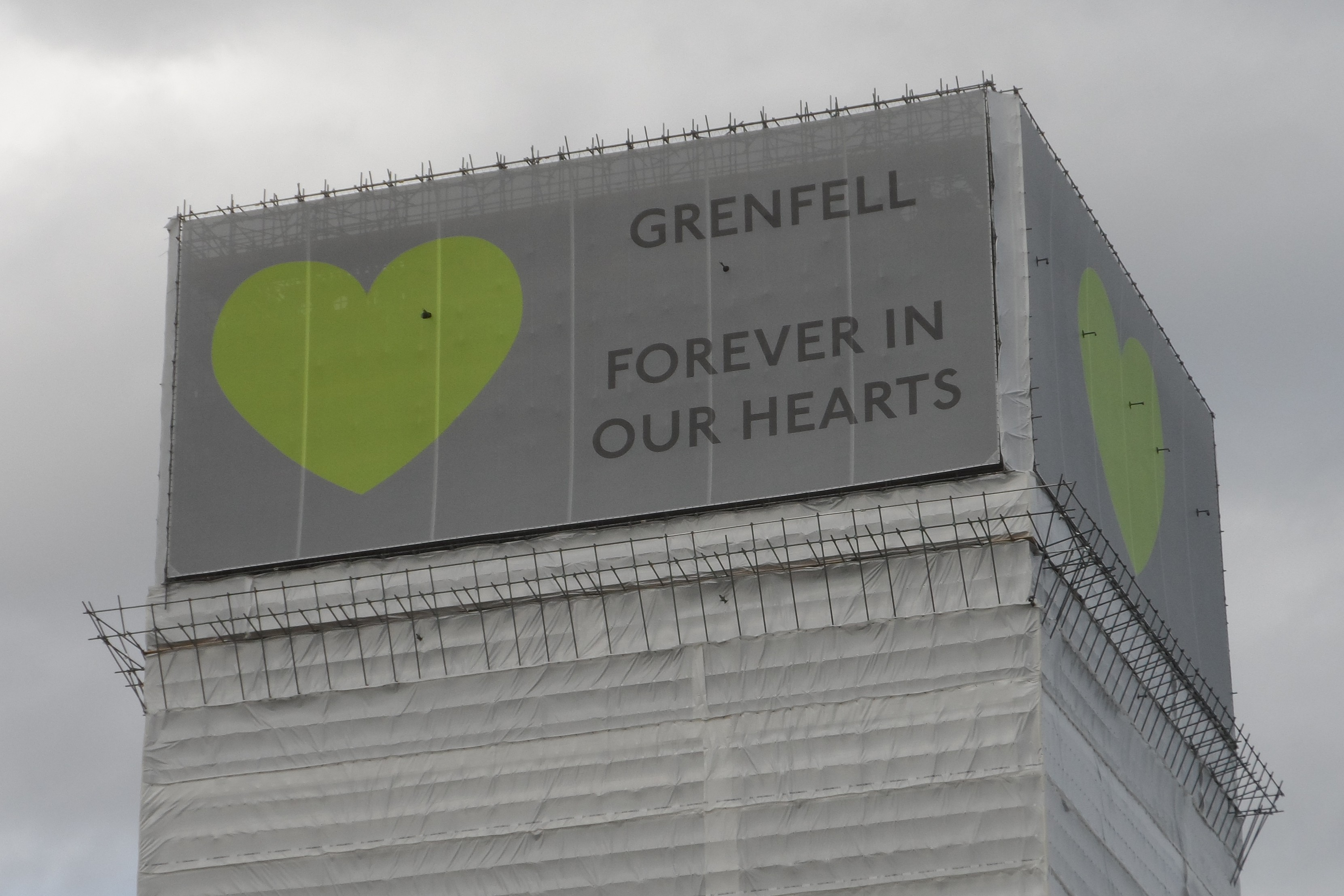
Top of Grenfell Tower a few days after the one-year anniversary, with the commemorative banners bearing a green heart symbol 💚 and wording GRENFELL FOREVER IN OUR HEARTS.

On 14 June 2018, to mark the first anniversary:

- Grenfell Tower and other public buildings were illuminated green.
- A national moment of silence was held at noon for 72 seconds in remembrance of those who died in the fire.
- The Grenfell Inquiry was suspended for the week to allow people to grieve and attend memorials.

British-Iraqi rapper and activist Lowkey released "Ghosts of Grenfell", a tribute song in response to the Grenfell tragedy and its effect on the local community, as part of his album Soundtrack of the Struggle.

In 2019, Chatto Books published a poetry collection by Jay Bernard entitled Surge, which read the Grenfell tragedy in relation to the New Cross fire and the Windrush Scandal.

Grenfell has been remembered at the nearby Notting Hill Carnival. On both days at the 2017 carnival, a minute's silence was observed in tribute to the victims of the Grenfell Tower fire, with many carnival-goers wearing "green for Grenfell". In 2022, the Carnival returned after a two-year hiatus due to COVID-19, starting with a run and including a 72 second silence to remember 72 victims.

In 2020, a virtual service remembering the victims was held online due to the COVID-19 pandemic in the United Kingdom.

== Rehousing ==
Grenfell Tower had 129 flats but rehousing will require over 200 dwellings. This is due to multiple households asking to be rehoused in more than one dwelling, such as those with grandparents or grown-up children.

As of 13 June 2018, there are 203 households of survivors from Grenfell Tower. Of these, 83 are living in a permanent home (up from 28 in October 2017), and 101 have accepted an offer of a permanent home but not yet moved in. Of the 120 who are not in a permanent home, 52 are in temporary accommodation and 68 are in emergency accommodation (42 in hotels, 22 in serviced apartments and 4 with family or friends). Out of the 129 households who were evacuated from the surrounding buildings, 38 have returned to their homes, one is in a permanent new home, 75 are in temporary accommodation and 15 are in emergency accommodation.

The government acquired 68 flats in a newly built development at Kensington Row—in the same borough as Grenfell Tower, and about 1.5 miles (2.4 km) from the Tower—and 31 on Hortensia Road, Chelsea. By December 2017, the council had purchased 250 homes to meet the requirements, and by March 2018, 307 homes. Eight Grenfell families still remained in temporary accommodation by October 2019.

== See also ==
- Barking fire
- Building regulations in the United Kingdom § Part B. Fire safety
- The Dalmarnock fire tests - A televised highrise fire-test, conducted in Scotland 2006
- Fire services in the United Kingdom
- Fire escape
- History of fire safety legislation in the United Kingdom
- King's Cross fire - The 1987 London fire that likewise spread upward due to the trench effect, where hot gases will adhere to nearby surfaces and inclined planes
- Skyscraper fire - List of notable tower block fires
