= Michael Day =

Michael or Mike Day may refer to:

- Michael Day (guitarist), American guitarist
- Michael Day (cricketer) (born 1974), Australian cricketer
- Mike Day (darts player) (born 1955), New Zealand darts player
- Mike Day (cyclist) (born 1984), American bicycle motocross (BMX) racer
- Michael S. Day, member of the Massachusetts House of Representatives
- Michael Day (paleoanthropologist) (1927–2018), British anatomist and paleoanthropologist
- Mikey Day (born 1980), American comedian
- Mike Day (filmmaker) (born 1979), Scottish documentarian and cinematographer

== See also ==
- Michael Bay, an American filmmaker
- Michael Davis (disambiguation)
