= Kensington Leisure Centre =

Leisure centre in London, England

Coordinates: 51.51354°N 0.21391°W

- Interactive map of the Kensington Leisure Centre area
- Former names: Kensington Sports Centre

General information
- Location: North Kensington
- Current tenants: Better Leisure (a division of (GLL) Greenwich Leisure Ltd)
- Construction started: 2014
- Opened: 2016
- Owner: Kensington and Chelsea London Borough Council

Design and construction
- Architecture firm: Studio E

Kensington Leisure Centre is a leisure centre located in the North Kensington area of the Royal Borough of Kensington and Chelsea, in London, England. It occupies land formerly considered to be part of the Lancaster West Estate, and was built with the Kensington Aldridge Academy. Both were officially opened by Catherine, Duchess of Cambridge in January 2015.

== History ==
The Royal Borough of Kensington and Chelsea had a shortage of school places and it was tentatively suggested during the "Towards Preferred Options Core Strategy and the North Kensington Plan" consultations in July 2008, that the "Kensington Sports Centre Key Site" was a possible site. The Kensington Sports Centre already existed but was in need of refurbishment, and it was thought that the two could share the same site.

On 17 November 2008 the ‘Family and Children's Services Oversight and Scrutiny Committee Working Group On Secondary Provision In North Kensington’ recommended the Lancaster West site for a proposed new academy. Consultants,'Urban Initiatives'were appointed in January 2009 to carry out a masterplanning study of the Notting Barns South area, with a view to large scale regeneration of the council-owned estates. The report, known as the Latimer Plan, or the Notting Barns South Masterplan made wide recommendations for relocating facilities, demolishing building such as the Grenfell Tower, and the Baranden Walk finger block and Verity Close and the building afresh. It was not adopted, though the principle of the combined leisure centre and school was established. There was an imperative to start construction within five years while the "Building Schools for the Future" funding was available. In reconfiguring the site, two areas of public open space were subsumed ignoring the requirements of the government planning document PPG 17, and causing local resentment.

The project was managed by Studio E architects and the building designed by LA architects. The former sports centre was closed in 2012 and demolished. It was replaced by a £29 million new build.

== Facilities ==
The centre is run by Better Leisure. It offers its members a 120 station gym, group fitness classes, a wet side with a 25m main pool with 250 seat spectator gallery, 20m teaching pool, leisure pool, swimming lessons. It has an eight-court multi-use sports hall, three studios, including a dedicated group cycle studio. It has catering in the form of a cafe. The Spa Experience includes a sauna and steam rooms. The centre's squash courts were reopened in January 2020 after maintenance issues.
