= Peter Deakin =

Peter Deakin may refer to:

- Peter Deakin (British Army officer) (1910–1992), British general
- Peter Deakin (rugby) (1953–2003), rugby league and rugby union administrator
- Peter Deakin (cricketer) (born 1970), English cricketer
- Peter Deakin (footballer) (born 1938), English football inside forward
- Peter Deakins, British architect
