= Kensington Row =

Coordinates: 51.4951°N 0.2045°W

Kensington Row is a £2 billion development in West Kensington, London W14. It is beside Warwick Road (part of the A3220), south of Kensington High Street.

Kensington Row is being built by St Edward, part of the Berkeley Group. The development comprises 160 apartments over 4 blocks. The flats are a mix of private and social rented. Private flats in the development are priced from £1,575,000 to £3,545,000, and penthouses up to £13 million.

On 20 June 2017, it was announced that 68 of the social rented flats had been acquired to provide permanent housing for families who had been made homeless by the Grenfell Tower fire of 14 June. The deal was negotiated by the Homes and Communities Agency on behalf of the British government, and the families will move in, in July and August. Grenfell Tower is about 1.5 miles (2.4 km) to the north.
