= Bellway =

British property development company

Bellway plc
- Formerly: Globemaster Services Limited (1978–1979)
- Type: Public
- Traded as: LSE: BWY; FTSE 250 component
- Industry: Housebuilding
- Founded: 1946
- Headquarters: Newcastle upon Tyne, England
- Key people: John Tutte (Chairman); Jason Honeyman (CEO)
- Revenue: ▲£3,162.2 million (2026)
- Operating income: ▲£299.1 million (2026)
- Net income: ▲£193.4 million (2026)
- Website: bellway.co.uk

Bellway plc is a residential property developer and housebuilder based in Newcastle upon Tyne, England. It is listed on the London Stock Exchange and is a constituent of the FTSE 250 Index.

== History ==
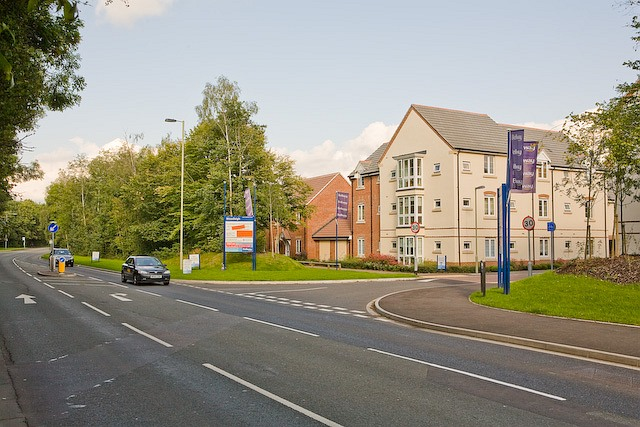
A Bellway development in Hampshire, England

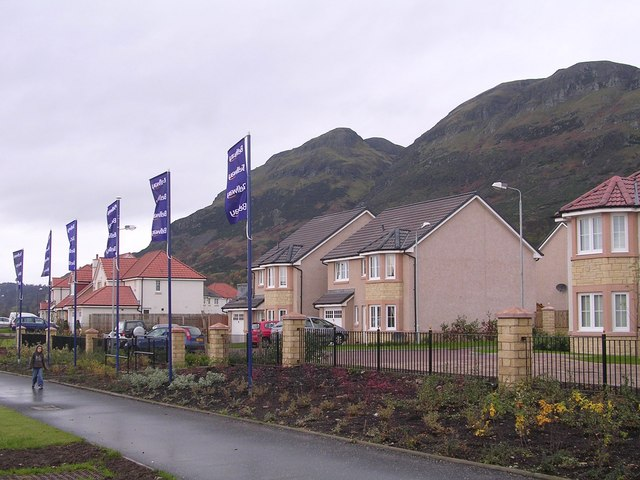
A Bellway development in Clackmannanshire, Scotland

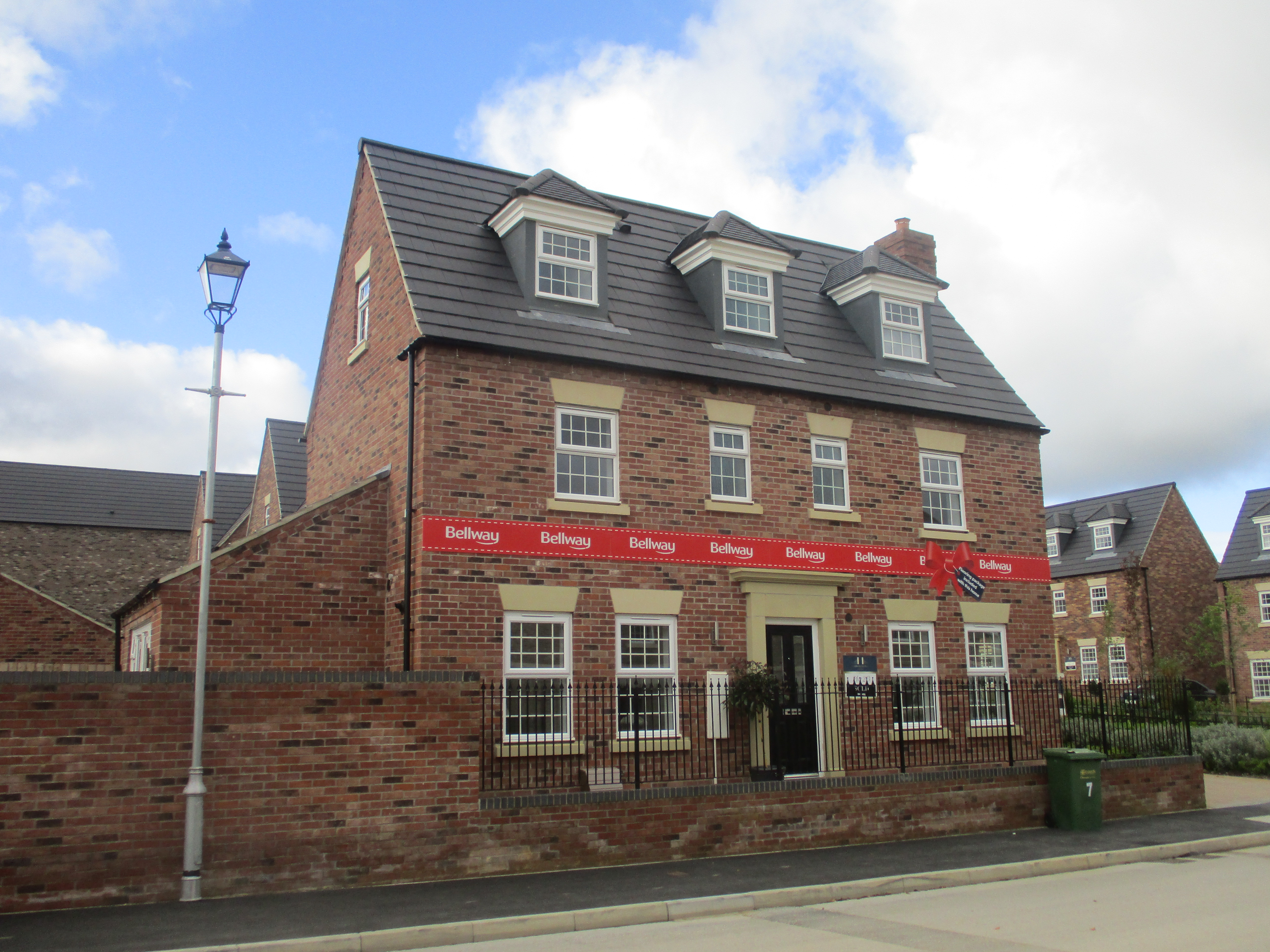
A Bellway home in promotional banners in Wetherby, West Yorkshire.

The company was founded in 1946 by John Thomas Bell and his sons, John and Russell, as a housebuilder operating in Newcastle upon Tyne under the name John T. Bell & Sons. In 1951, Kenneth Bell, the youngest of the brothers, joined the business. The three brothers also developed commercial property in the 1950s and their company, North British Properties, was floated on the London Stock Exchange in 1961. Two years later, North British acquired John T Bell via a reverse takeover.

The Bell family managed to tap into the huge demand for private housing that followed the Second World War by promoting developments, such as Cramlington New Town, that were built in partnership with William Leech in the early 1960s. Bellway developed a substantial housebuilding operation in the north of England and sales reached 1,500 units in 1972 with a further 500 in the newly formed Australian and French subsidiaries. In 1973, Bellway moved into the south-east with the purchase of A & R A Searle. The group continued to expand through the UK throughout the 1970s, however, its overseas operations proved to be less successful and were eventually closed.

In 1979, the "Bellway" private housebuilding business was demerged from the commercial side of the firm under the leadership of Kenneth Bell. During 1981, Bellway and fellow Newcastle housebuilder William Leech announced their intention to merge, however, the move was called off days later, allegedly on account of to incompatibilities between the lifestyles of the two firms. Diversification had not been wholly satisfactory; Ken Bell became largely non-executive and the day-to-day running of the business was assumed by Howard Dawe. Dawe reorganised the business, resumed the regional expansion on a more profitable basis and increased the company's focus on regeneration sites.

During March 1990, Bellway opted to sell its plant hire subsidiary Blackett UK to Bruce Cook. Later that same year, it recorded a profit of £11.11 million, a 34.7 per cent drop over the previous year; Kenneth Bell, the company's chairman, spoke out against the prospect of newly-privatised electricity suppliers increasing the connection charges to new properties. In March 1991, the firm launched a £25 million rights issue, however, shareholders only took up 52.3 per cent of the shares in Bellway on offer. Nevertheless, the company had ample fiscal reserves throughout the early 1990s in spite of a recession.

During 1996, Bellway Homes marked its 50th anniversary; that same year, it announced favourable sale figures, in terms of both volume and price. One year later, Kenneth Bell died, ending the family's involvement with the company; Howard Dawe was quickly appointed as Bellway's acting chairman. That same year, the firm recorded an above-expectation profit of £50.3 million, a rise of 56 per cent over the previous year; unit sales has also risen by 18 per cent to 5,002 homes. Profits would continue to grow in the following year, a trend that was partially attributed to sustained rises property values and low interest rates.

During February 1999, two of Bellway's worksites were picketed by bricklayers following a payment dispute with a subcontractor. That same year, the company's finances were negatively impacted by site-based planning issues. In October 2000, it was announced that pre-tax profit had risen 31 per cent to £89.1 million while turnover had risen to £634 million, up 25 per cent year-on-year.

During early 2013, the firm's profits had reportedly risen by 50 per cent. In March 2015, Bellway announced that profits were up 53 per cent; it also noted that the Help to Buy scheme had accounted for 23.8 per cent of all new reservation. During the following year, its margins rose to 22 per cent.

In March 2018, the company was reported to be on track to build 10,000 homes for the first time in its history; this increase in activity was attributed to low interest rates and good mortgage finance providing buoyancy to the housing market. During 2019, Bellway announced that it was reducing its exposure to the London housing market in favour of developments outside of the capital, which were deemed to be more profitable.

In common with other housebuilders, Bellway was adversely affected by the COVID-19 pandemic in the United Kingdom during 2020; in June of that year, it reported sales had fallen by more than two-thirds since the introduction of lockdown, and expected "year-on-year sales activity to be severely constrained until a time when 'lockdown' restrictions are further lifted." one month later, it announced plans to cut up to 175 jobs, around 6% of its 3,100-strong workforce. By August 2021, the firm's turnover had nearly returned to pre-pandemic levels, profitability continued to rise into 2022.

Amid a housing slump in August 2023, Bellway announced the closure of its London Partnerships and South Midlands divisions along with 90 redundancies.

In February 2024, Bellway was among eight UK house-builders targeted by the Competition and Markets Authority in an investigation into suspected breaches of competition law. The CMA said it had evidence that firms shared commercially sensitive information with competitors, influencing the build-out of sites and the prices of new homes. In January 2025, the CMA said it was conducting further investigations into the suspected anti-competitive conduct. In June 2025, the CMA investigation was extended to August 2025. In July 2025, the housebuilders offered to pay £100 million towards affordable housing programme as part of an agreement to reform practices on information sharing and end the investigation without admitting any liability or wrongdoing. On 30 October 2025, the CMA confirmed its investigation had been dropped in return for a £100m payment towards affordable homes and other measures including the development of industry-wide guidance on information sharing and agreements not to share certain types of information with other housebuilders.

In June 2024, Bellway's latest bid to acquire rival Crest Nicholson was rejected; it had made all-share proposals on 25 April and 14 May, the latter valuing the firm at £650m. On 10 July 2024, the Crest Nicholson board said it was "minded to recommend" an improved Bellway takeover offer of £720m to the company's shareholders. On 8 August, the two companies were given a further 12 days to finish their due diligence work regarding the proposed merger, but Bellway called off its bid on 13 August 2024.

In the year to July 31 2026, Bellway revenue grew to £3,162.2m (up from £2,782.8m), returning a pre-tax profit of £270.2m (up from £221.9m). In November 2026, Bellway began makinge redundancies as the housing market stalled.

== Criticisms and quality concerns ==
=== Fire safety problems ===
A major fire broke out in July 2015 at a housing development constructed by Bellway in Canterbury, which destroyed and damaged 45 homes. An investigation launched in 2016 discovered problems in the fire separation constructed between the properties. Repairs to the development began in November 2018.

In May 2019, a Watchdog investigation was screened on BBC One regarding the fire safety of Bellway and Persimmon plc homes. In the programme a surveyor visited an estate developed by Bellway after concerns about fire safety had been raised by a resident. The investigation found safety breaches in every property that was looked at due to poorly fitted fire barriers.

On 9 June 2019, a fire took place at the newly built Samuel Garside House located in De Pass Garden, which was constructed by Bellway. Peter Mason, chair of the Barking Reach residents’ association had contacted Bellway prior to the fire expressing concern about the potential fire risk of the development, but was told not to worry. London mayor Sadiq Khan described the fire as "shocking" and stated that it could have "easily resulted in fatalities".

In June 2021, protesters picketed the Bellway offices in Prestwich and Beckton to demand that the company repair numerous fire safety issues which had been discovered in their properties. The safety issues left residents "living in fear" and unable to sell or remortgage their homes.

In 2021, a number fire safety issues were found in Bellway's Lamba Court complex in Salford. A number of cavity barriers were found to be inadequately secured, missing or stuffed with plastic bubble wrap. It was reported that some residents faced bankruptcy from the "ruinous costs" for the repairs and one resident spoke to the press about how the stress has taken a significant toll on her mental health.

In October 2025, Bellway reported it had set aside £707.5 million since 2017 for post-Grenfell cladding and safety improvements for legacy buildings in England, Scotland and Wales.

=== Building defects ===
In April 2024, Bellway apologised after a home-buyer complained about flooding issues affecting a £300,000 home in Edinburgh.

In August 2024, the BBC reported residents' problems at Bassingbourn Fields, a housing estate in Fordham, Cambridgeshire, built by Bellway (nicknamed "Hellway" by residents).

In October 2024, a BBC report described how a gas engineer had condemned a gas boiler installed in a Bellway-built house in Blandford St Mary, Dorset, completed in 2023.

In November 2024, the BBC reported problems (including unfinished roads, flooding, loose electrical sockets and holes in ceilings) encountered by home-buyers in a Bellway-built estate in Llay, Wrexham, since it was built in 2020.

In January 2025, the BBC reported on roofing problems in newly built homes in the Willow Green estate in Cranfield, Bedfordshire, and in Brentwood, Essex.

=== Other events ===
In February 2026, Bellway felled a 59-year-old tree which had been planted in 1967 to commemorate the death of Winston Churchill. The tree was removed to clear access to a new housing development in the village of Cossington, Leicestershire.

== Operations ==
Bellway has 20 operating divisions across England, Scotland and Wales. The divisional structure allows local management teams, supported by Regional Chairs, Regional Finance Directors and specialist Group functions, to respond to regional needs.

In 2025, the company achieved a 5-star rating in the 2024/25 Home Builders Federation new home customer satisfaction survey, for the ninth consecutive year.
