= John Thomas Bell =

British businessman (1878–1965)

- Born: 1878; North Seaton, Northumberland
- Died: 1965 (aged 86–87)
- Occupation: Businessman

John Thomas Bell (1878–1965) was, together with his two sons, the founder of Bellway, one of the United Kingdom's largest housebuilding businesses.

== Career ==
The son of William Bell and Mary Jane Craig, "J.T" was brought up in North Seaton, Northumberland. He worked in the stone quarry by day and built his first houses by night. He formed his own building business (probably after the First War) and in the 1920s built 400 to 500 houses in the Newbiggin area. His business failed in the 1930s slump and he returned to being a manager for another builder. In 1946 his two sons, John and Russell, joined him and re-launched the business. John Bell died in 1965.
