= Kensington Aldridge Academy =

Location
- 1 Silchester Road, Kensington; London, W10 6EX; England; 51.51468°N 0.21525°W

Information
- Other name: KAA
- Type: Academy
- Motto: Intrepidus (To be bold, brave)
- Established: September 2014; 11 years ago
- Local authority: Kensington & Chelsea
- Trust: Freestanding sponsors Aldridge Education AE
- Specialists: arts (creative and performing arts)
- Department for Education URN: 140212 Tables
- Ofsted: Reports
- Principal: Anna Jordan
- Gender: Mixed
- Age range: 11–18
- Enrolment: 1,259 (2023-2024)
- Capacity: 1,140
- Houses: Angelou, Franklin, Honeyball and Pankhurst
- Website: www.kaa.org.uk

Kensington Aldridge Academy (KAA) is an 11–18 co-educational secondary school with academy status in the North Kensington area of London, England. KAA opened in September 2014, and was officially opened by Catherine, Duchess of Cambridge in January 2015. The Academy's sixth form opened in September 2016. The school specialisms are Entrepreneurship and Creative & Performing Arts.

KAA is a free-standing Academy Trust with lead sponsorship from the Aldridge Education (AE), a multi-academy trust established by Sir Rod Aldridge's charity the Aldridge Foundation. The academy is co-sponsored by the Royal Borough of Kensington and Chelsea.

The academy achieved an outstanding Ofsted rating in its first inspection in December 2017. In June 2018 KAA was named TES Secondary School of the Year. At the same awards ceremony, the school was presented with an award for Services to Education in recognition of the school's response to the Grenfell Tower fire. The academy achieved a second outstanding Ofsted rating in a section 8 inspection in March 2024.

== History ==
The Royal Borough of Kensington and Chelsea had a shortage of school places and it was tentatively suggested during the “Towards Preferred Options Core Strategy and the North Kensington Plan” consultations in July 2008, that the “Kensington Sports Centre Key Site” was a possible site. The Kensington Sports Centre already existed but was in need of refurbishment, and it was thought that the two could share the same site. Even at this early stage is recognised that space available fell far short of the governments recommended requirements, and further open space needed to be obtained.

On 17 November 2008 the ‘Family and Children’s Services Oversight and Scrutiny Committee Working Group On Secondary Provision In North Kensington’ recommended the Lancaster West site for a proposed new academy. Consultants, 'Urban Initiatives' were appointed in January 2009 to carry out a masterplanning study of the Notting Barns South area, with a view to large-scale regeneration of the council-owned estates. The report, known as the Latimer Plan, or the Notting Barns South Masterplan, made wide recommendation for relocating facilities, demolishing building such as the Grenfell Tower, and the Baranden Walk finger block and Verity Close and the building afresh. It was not adopted, though the principle of the combined leisure centre and school was established.

Six sites were being considered, Barlby Road Primary School, St Mary's/Middle Row Primary Schools, the Princess Louise Hospital site, the Kensal Gasworks site and the Latimer (Kensington Sports Centre) site, but there was an imperative to start construction within five years while the “Building Schools for the Future” funding was available. In reconfiguring the site, two areas of public open space were subsumed ignoring the requirements of the government planning document PPG 17, and causing local resentment.

The proposed school was to be six-form entry and roughly equivalent in capacity to Holland Park School which invited comparisons. Holland Park has 23,392 sq m of external play space, while Kensington Academy has 3,881 sq m of external space which includes the delivery bay and the approach road. Much of the external space is on the roofs.

== Key Stage 3 & 4 Curriculum ==
The school offers a range of subjects, including Dance, Drama and Music at Key Stage 3. Students are asked to choose their GCSE subjects at the end of Year 9. They must choose four GCSE courses from the optional courses, in addition to studying Maths, English and Science.

| Key Stage Three Curriculum | Key Stage Four Curriculum |
|---|---|
| English | English |
| Maths | Maths |
| Sciences | Double or Triple |
| Art | Optional |
| Citizenship | Optional |
| Computer Science | Optional |
| Creative Media | Optional |
| Dance | Optional |
| Design & Technology | Optional |
| Drama | Optional |
| Geography | Optional |
| History | Optional |
| Modern Foreign Languages (French or German) | Optional |
| Music | Optional |
| Physical Education | Core / Optional for GCSE |
| Religious Studies | Optional |
| Textiles | Optional |
| CNAT Sport Studies | Optional |
| Construction BTEC | Optional |
| Statistics | Optional |

== Autism unit ==
The ASSC (Autism Spectrum Specialist Centre) is an inclusion centre within the academy that provides specialist provision for high-functioning autistic students and pupils with Asperger syndrome, with the intention of encouraging students to "participate, progress and achieve both in the centre and alongside their peers in mainstream lessons".

== Grenfell Tower fire ==
The school was built next to the Grenfell Tower, the scene of a major fire in June 2017. Four current students and one who had recently left lost their lives in the disaster. The school was located in the cordoned area and was closed.

On the morning of 14 June, 56 out of 60 students made it to an AS-level Maths exam. They were "shellshocked", said Benson, the head teacher, "and some were in borrowed clothes." Later, students studied during their convalescence, a year 8 student emailed her computer science homework to her teacher from her hospital bed.

Students were given assemblies on how to deal with the aftermath and spent the final 6 weeks of the summer term taught by KAA teachers at other local schools, ARK Burlington Danes Academy and Latymer Upper School. Almost all students continued to turn up for their lessons at the temporary sites, with attendance at 90%.

For the following academic year, the Academy was moved to a temporary site on licensed by Hammersmith and Fulham at Wormwood Scrubs close to Burlington Danes Academy, on the Woodman Mews estate. The temporary school, dubbed KAA2, was built by Portakabin with five blocks of portable buildings and included science labs, a dance studio and art rooms. Described by the headteacher as the "fastest school ever built", it opened in September 2017 after more than 200 workers worked all day, and then 24 hours a day in the final weeks, to complete it in nine weeks.

Following consultation with staff, students and parents, the school returned to its original buildings in September 2018 after Grenfell Tower was covered in scaffolding and protective wrap four months prior in May 2018. The two-part documentary The Choir: Our School by the Tower was aired in April 2019 and follows Gareth Malone's visits to the school to assemble a choir over the course of 2018.
