= Peter Deakins =

British architect

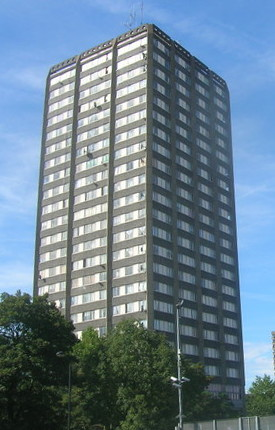
Grenfell Tower, Lancaster West Estate in 2009

Peter Deakins is a British architect who, following an involvement in the design and construction of Golden Lane Estate as well as the original Barbican Centre designs, later created the master plan for the Lancaster West Estate in the mid-1960s, of which the Grenfell Tower was part.

Commenting on the Grenfell Tower fire in July 2017, Deakins said, "I really can't get to grips with it ... it's too terrible to think about. And compared to all the high hopes when we started doing it all... it's just too horrible."
