= Harley Facades =

British cladding construction company

Harley Facades is a British construction company that designs and installs external cladding on buildings. Founded in 1996, it established a specialist cladding division in 2002. In 2015, it was contracted to install cladding on Grenfell Tower in west London. After a June 2017 fire killed 72 people in the tower, the Grenfell Tower Inquiry said Harley bore "a significant degree of responsibility for the fire".

== History ==
Ray Bailey, the owner and managing director, founded the first Harley business (Harley Curtain Wall) in 1996, operating from home and "offering a limited range of aluminium windows and curtain wall products".

In 2002, Harley obtained its first major cladding contract, with Wates Construction to over-clad four 11-storey tower blocks in Croydon, which led it to establish a specialist cladding division focused on local authority and housing association blocks in London and the south-east. The company moved to a purpose built office in December 2013 - Harley House, Brooklands Park, Farningham Road, Crowborough, East Sussex.

=== Grenfell Tower ===
In 2015, Harley secured a £2.6m contract from Rydon to design and supply the ACM panels at Grenfell Tower. In September 2015 the company Harley Curtain Wall Ltd (Company Number 03244209) was formally placed into administration, owing around £1m to its unsecured trade creditors and had appointed Begbies Traynor as administrators.

Within days, as part of a pre-packaged insolvency deal, the company's assets were purchased for £24,900 plus VAT by Harley Facades Limited, a similarly-named company, also owned by Ray Bailey since 2001 but which had been dormant until 2015. The Grenfell Tower contract was subsequently novated to the new company independently of the administration. The original Harley company remains in liquidation (as of October 2019) pending the outcome of negotiations with HMRC concerning a £1.6m claim surrounding allegations of the use of tax avoidance schemes.

Although Rydon was the main contractor responsible for the 2015-2016 refurbishment of the Chalcots Estate and Grenfell Tower (destroyed by fire in June 2017), it sub-contracted the "design and installation of the external cladding" to Harley Curtain Wall (later Harley Facades).

In response to a request filed on behalf of several invidividuals and companies linked to the Grenfell Tower refurbishment (including both Rydon and Harley Facades), the Attorney General for England and Wales, Suella Braverman, confirmed that witnesses would be immune from prosecution based on their statements to the enquiry.

On 4 September 2024, the final report of Grenfell Tower Inquiry said Harley "did not concern itself sufficiently with fire safety at any stage of the refurbishment and it appears to have thought that there was no need for it to do so, because others involved in the project and ultimately building control, would ensure the design was safe." Harley was able to negotiate a favourable price for the combustible Arconic panels due to "its existing relationship with Arconic and the cladding fabricator CEP Facades", and bore "a significant degree of responsibility for the fire".
