= Rydon =

British construction company

Rydon logo

Rydon is a British facilities management and property maintenance company which was founded in 1978. Its head office is in Dartford, Kent, and it has two maintenance offices in London. It employed an average of 423 people in the year to September 2022, and in the year to 30 September 2025 reported a pre-tax loss of £4.9m on turnover of £52m, its sixth successive loss.

Until 2021, Rydon was also a building contractor and employed over 650 people. Rydon was the contractor responsible for refurbishment of the Grenfell Tower (destroyed by fire in June 2017, killing 72 people) and was said to have given "inadequate thought to fire safety, to which it displayed a casual attitude" and bore "considerable responsibility for the fire".

In 2021, Rydon divested its contracting operations to a new business, Real. This collapsed into administration in late 2023 owing over £8m.

== Controversies ==
=== Grenfell Tower ===
Rydon was the main contractor for refurbishment of the Grenfell Tower (destroyed by fire in June 2017, killing 72 people), in the Royal Borough of Kensington and Chelsea, although it sub-contracted the "design and installation of the external cladding" to Harley Facades. The contractor originally scheduled to undertake the Grenfell renovation was rejected because its quotation of £11.28 million exceeded the £10 million budget set by the Royal Borough of Kensington and Chelsea and Kensington and Chelsea TMO (KCTMO). Rydon gained approval for the project with a quote of £8.7 million after the contract was put out to further competitive tender. The geographer Gordon MacLeod has described KCTMO's contract with Rydon, and Rydon's use of subcontractors in the refurbishment, as an instance of "the disavowal of democracy" that led to the fire.

The UK government subsequently placed Rydon on an official list of firms recommended to build high-rise housing, a move that sparked anger among Grenfell survivors.

In reaction to comments made on Twitter by pressure group Grenfell United, Robert Jenrick, the Secretary of State for Housing, Communities and Local Government, replied on Twitter stating that "The contractor should not bid for further work until we know the truth."

Separately to Jenrick's comments, the Mayor of London, Sadiq Khan, announced that Rydon would be excluded from the London Development Panel (LDP2) framework listing approved suppliers for housing works until the Grenfell Tower Inquiry outcome was known. And in December 2021, subsidiary Rydon Homes was blocked from the government’s help to buy loan scheme because of concerns about "unacceptable business practices" in the group. Despite the bans, Rydon won several major contracts, including a £9.9m medtech scheme from Maidstone council, a £99m contract from Ealing council to regenerate the High Lane estate, a £30m contract for the University of Bath, and a series of maintenance contracts with NHS trusts.

In response to a request filed on behalf of several individuals and companies linked to the Grenfell Tower refurbishment (including Rydon), the Attorney General for England and Wales, Suella Braverman, confirmed that witnesses would be immune from prosecution based on their statements to the enquiry.

In July 2020 the Grenfell Tower Inquiry heard that Rydon secretly kept £126,000 paid by KCTMO when switching the cladding on Grenfell Tower, by informing KCTMO that the savings afforded by using more flammable plastic-filled aluminium panels in place of the originally specified zinc cladding would be less than they in fact were. The inquiry also heard that Rydon promised on five occasions to appoint fire safety advisers but failed to do so. During the inquiry Simon Lawrence, who led Rydon's work on Grenfell Tower, described residents of the buildings who complained about fire safety conditions prior to the fire as "aggressive"; he claimed that "regardless of what work was being carried out [they] would still have found a reason to complain."

In July 2023, Rydon revealed a provision of £26.7m to cover the cost of its part of a settlement with over 900 survivors and bereaved family members of the tragedy. Rydon Group Holdings reported £64m in revenue in the year to 30 September 2023, with its construction arm, working on existing legacy contracts, suffering a £9.7m loss from £0.6m revenue. Rydon had drawn down £20m of a £27m provision for Grenfell; the remaining provision was topped up with an extra £6.3m.

Published in September 2024, the official Grenfell Tower Inquiry report said Rydon gave "inadequate thought to fire safety, to which it displayed a casual attitude” and "failed to take proper steps to investigate Harley's competence … it was complacent about the need for fire engineering advice". The company bore "considerable responsibility for the fire", said the report.

=== Chalcots Estate ===
Rydon was the main contractor responsible for the 2015–2016 refurbishment of the Chalcots Estate, in the London Borough of Camden. In November 2019, Camden Council began High Court proceedings against Rydon to recover costs relating to repairs to the Chalcots Estate.

=== William Cotton Place, Bow ===
Between 2011 and 2013, Rydon constructed two residential buildings in Bow, east London later found to have combustible cladding and insulation that left them "not fit for human habitation". In 2026, housing association Poplar HARCA sued Rydon for £3.4m to cover remediation costs.

== Divestment ==
In April 2021, Rydon Group sold its southeastern and southwestern contracting businesses, with 100 staff and 10 Rydon Construction contracts ranging in value from £10m to £180m, to a newly established company, Real.

This left the main Rydon business focused on facilities management and property maintenance services. In May 2025, Rydon Group reported a pre-tax loss of £1.0m (2023: £9.1m loss) on turnover of £61.0m (2023: £47.5m), its fifth successive loss. In May 2026, Rydon Group reported an increased pre-tax loss of £4.9m on turnover down 14% to £52m. In total, Rydon had spent £31m on building safety liability costs.

=== Real collapse into administration ===
In September 2023, Real LSE (Real London and South East) filed to go into administration, followed by the southwest region in early October. On 4 October 2023, all staff at Real were made redundant after CEO Paul Nicholls conceded the business had no future. It owed over £8m to creditors.
