= Michael Day (paleoanthropologist) =

Michael Herbert Day (March 8, 1927 – June 1, 2018) was a British anatomist and paleoanthropologist. His research concentrated on the morphology of postcranial remains to understand the evolution of locomotion in the hominin clade. He was the author of the Guide to Fossil Man, the first English publication to review the hominin fossil record. Day eventually worked in the Department of Anatomy at the Middlesex Hospital Medical School and served as the Chair of Anatomy at St. Thomas's Hospital Medical School until his retirement.

== Early life and education ==
Day was born in the North Kensington neighborhood of London, England. When he was 13, his family evacuated London and moved to Sevenoaks during The Blitz of World War II. He graduated secondary school from the prestigious Sevenoaks School in Kent. In 1945, he joined the Royal Air Force where he served as a Lancaster bomber mechanic in the Middle East for three years. Immediately following his service, Day began pursuing his medical degree at the Royal Free Hospital School of Medicine (RFHSM), qualifying in 1954. Day joined the Anatomy Department at RFHSM with the initial intent of becoming an orthopedic surgeon. However, when John Napier created the Unit of Primatology and Human Evolution (within the Anatomy Department) in 1954, Day was inspired to pursue a career in hominin evolution and abandon his plans to become an orthopedic surgeon. Consequently, he enrolled at the University of London and obtained his PhD in 1962 by defending his thesis on the blood supply to the lumbo-sacral plexus.

== Career and Research ==
After graduating in 1962, Day joined Napier at the Unit of Primatology and Human Evolution. From the award of his PhD to 1964, Day published four articles, two on his own and two in conjunction with Napier, that reflect his collaboration with Napier on the human hand.

During the early 1960s, Napier worked alongside Wilfrid Le Gros Clark, who was conducting research at the Department of Anatomy at Oxford University, interpreting ape postcranial fossils excavated from Kenya by Mary and Louis Leakey. This relationship paved the way for Day's research trip to Olduvai Gorge, Kenya when Le Gros Clark recommended Napier, who recommended Day, to Mary Leakey for the trip. Day and Napier studied the OH 8 foot bones found in Bed I, eventually concluding that the specimen belongs to Homo habilis rather than to Paranthropus boisei because of its morphological features that indicated obligatory bipedalism (Day and Napier, 1964). Day and Napier collaborated in a second publication (Day and Napier 1966) writing about OH 10 and Day wrote a solo paper about the OH 7 hand bones the next year (Day, 1967).

Mary Leakey took charge of the research at Olduvai Gorge during the late 1960s and Day consequently became her go-to anatomist for understanding fossil evidence. From the late 1960s through the 1970s, Day was particularly prolific in publishing on postcranial evidence excavated from the Leakey expeditions. Notably, Day collaborated with Bernard Wood in an analysis of the OH 8 talus (Day and Wood, 1968), associated the OH 20 proximal femur with australopith remains found in South Africa (Day, 1969a), interpreted the OH 28 femur and pelvis (Day, 1971), and investigated the Laetoli footprints using photogrammetry (Day and Wickens, 1980). Additionally, Day published on cranial evidence from the Omo Crania (Day, 1969b) and from the Ngaloba cranium (Day et al., 1980), as well as publications that addressed the vexed problem of how to define Homo sapiens.

Day published a wide-ranging review and analysis of the hominin fossil record called the Guide to Fossil Man. Day published four versions: two in 1976, one in 1978, and the final version in 1986. This comprehensive publication remains popular among paleoanthropologists and students worldwide today.

Day met his wife of 70 years, José (Micky) Ashton, at the RFHSM shortly before leaving to teach at The Middlesex Hospital Medical School. Here, he mentored six doctoral students and became a University Reader. In 1972, he was chosen by the St. Thomas's Hospital Medical School as the new Chair of Anatomy. He served in this position for 17 years until his retirement in 1989. After retiring from teaching, he worked at London's Natural History Museum for 25 years. During his career, Day served as President of the Primate Society of Great Britain from 1976 to 1979 and President of the Royal Anthropological Institute from 1979 to 1983. Additionally, he helped create and lead the World Archaeological Congress in 1986.

Day lived with his wife in Hampstead, North London, and eventually Kelsale, Suffolk, until his death on June 1, 2018, from bowel cancer; he was 91.
