= Lancaster West Estate =

Housing estate in North Kensington, London

Coordinates: 51.513187°N 0.216466°W

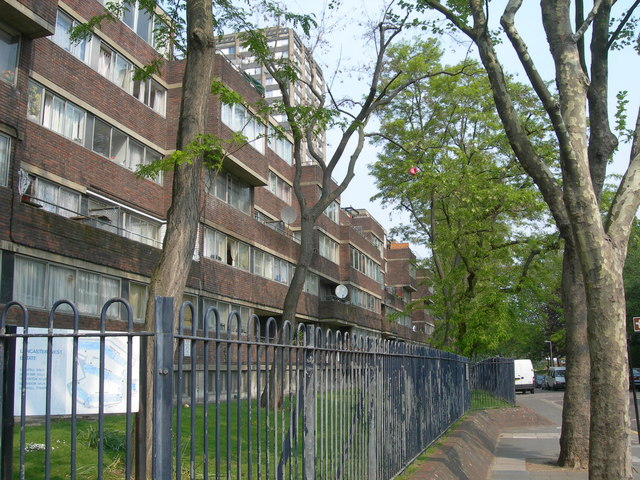
- The estate from Grenfell Road, 2007. Barandon Walk is in the foreground, and Grenfell Tower is in the background

- Map of the western side of the Estate
- Interactive map of Lancaster West Estate

General information
- No. of blocks: 1
- No. of units: 795

Construction
- Constructed: 1972-1988
- Style: Modernist

Other information
- Famous residents: Les Ferdinand

Lancaster West Estate is a housing estate in North Kensington, west London.

It is in an area known as Notting Dale which experienced V-2 bombing during the Second World War. It was built as municipal housing as part of the slum clearances of the 1960s.

The estate was designed in 1963-4 as part of a major Royal Borough of Kensington and Chelsea redevelopment scheme designed by architects Clifford Wearden and Peter Deakins but was later much modified and reduced in scale and ambition. It is immediately east of Latimer Road tube station. It opened in the mid 1970s, and was composed of one tower block (Grenfell Tower) of 23 stories and 900 other units. In the early hours of 14 June 2017, the Grenfell Tower caught fire, resulting in large loss of life.

== Geography ==
The plot occupied by the Lancaster West Estate was created by a Slum Clearance Order. Large parts of North Kensington were remodelled to create the Westway. To the west of the overground tube line is the earlier Silchester Estate. Formerly, Silchester Road continued into Clarendon Road and Lancaster Road continued from this six-way junction south-east to Bramley Road, but the lower part has now been renamed Whitchurch Road. The phase 1 of the estate stands on land previously occupied by the following streets:

- Blechynden Street (part of)
- Blechynden Mews
- Barandon Street
- Hurstway
- Testerton Street

Grenfell Road was extended to the north of Bomore Road.

To the north of phase 1, and on the original plot is Kensington Aldridge Academy and the Kensington Leisure Centre which replaced the once listed Silchester Road Baths. Further phases took in the land to the east of Clarendon Road, bounded by Lancaster Road, St Marks Road and Cornwall Crescent, including Verity Close and Camelford Walk.

The estate is served by two London Underground Stations, Latimer Road station and Ladbroke Grove station.

== History ==
Eighteenth-century Notting Hill was entirely rural and laid to grass. As the suburbs reached here, there was an oversupply of middle-class housing, bordering on the poor suburbs which serviced them. The poor lived in the Potteries, Notting Dale, Jennings Buildings and Kensal New Town. The women were mainly in service.

=== Potteries ===
Samuel Lake, the founder of the Potteries, was a night soil collector by profession, and his associate, Stevens, invested £100 to buy some land in Connaught Square, where he established piggeries, before moving them into the Dale.

Between 1837 and 1842, a part of the Dale to the east of Pottery Lane was fenced off to create a racecourse, the Kensington Hippodrome; the race track followed the line of Clarendon Road. This venture overlooked a public right of way that was used to avoid passing through the piggeries. The locals vigorously removed the fence at Ladbroke Grove and were supported by the parish. Furthermore, the ground, as suggested by the name 'potteries', was of soft clay, which made it unpopular with jockeys and most of the time unsuitable for either racing or training. The last Grand Steeplechase, recorded in a set of prints by Henry Alken Junior, was in 1841, and the Hippodrome closed in 1842. The Hippodrome fence stopped the piggeries physically expanding, and further compacted the increasing population.

The Poor Law Commissioners, in their fourth report, commented on the houses in the Potteries; "Some cottages at Notting Dale inhabited by Irish families and called the potteries are built over stagnant water. In some instances the floors have given way and one end of the room rests in the stagnant pool while the other end still being dry contains the bed or straw mattress on which the family sleeps."

=== Cholera ===
By 1849, the potteries or piggeries, a 'primaeval' hamlet, housed 1000 persons, and 3000 pigs living in 250 hovels set in 8 acres. It ran along James Street (now Walmer Road) and Thomas Street (now Avondale Park Road). There were two public houses, the King's Arms and the Black Boy. It was bounded to the south by Mary Place which was named after Mary, a pig farmer. The waters that drained from the Dale ran through ditches and open sewers into a large pool south of Mary Street; this was known as the Ocean.

The first attempt by the Metropolitan Board of Guardians to remove the pigs prompted a petition that revealed 188 families with 582 children relied on fattening pigs for their existence. Life expectancy was 11 years, and child mortality was at 87%. The families had donkey carts and daily visited the rich houses all around, taking their food waste. The edible was fed to the children and the rest boiled down for the fat or fed to the pigs, chickens and ducks. Dogs abounded, being used to protect the pigs. In 1850, after cholera had taken victims on Latimer Road, it was described by editor W. H. Wills in the first issue of Charles Dickens' publication Household Words as a 'Plague Spot'.

The Metropolitan Local Management Act 1855 established urban vestries. They determined that only 7% of the population admitted to keeping pigs – but more likely 25% were casual pigkeepers. The right to keep pigs had been legally established by Lake and Stevens. By 1860, a woman drowning in a ditch prompted the building of a mission hall and Blechynden Street ragged school. The pigs were finally evicted in the late 1870s through the efforts of two Medical Officers of Health, Dr Goodrich and Dr Dudfield. The ditches were filled in and sewers built. The shanty town was demolished and part of it was laid out as Avondale Park.

The demand for accommodation in the area became even greater. James Whitchurch built semi-detached upper-middle class villas along Lancaster Road and Silchester Road alongside the proposed Hammersmith and City Line. Latimer Road was demolished to form the track which opened in 1864. Latimer Road tube station opened on Bramley Road in 1868, and Whitchurch targeted the lower middle classes and artisans, building the "railway streets": Manchester, Mersey, Martin, Lockton, Hurstway, Barandon, Blechynden and Testerton. The housing built along Lancaster Road (beneath the Lancaster West Estate) Walmer Road (now beneath Dufford Street) Canterbury Street (now Bomore Road) did not attract owner occupiers and were soon subdivided into rooms for rent. The railway streets remained respectable for a century- when their lack of interior plumbing condemned them to be classed as slums.

The women found well-paid work in laundering, at first by hand in their own homes but later in steam laundries opened along Latimer Road. Many men worked on the railways or a distance from home.

=== Post-war immigration and Rachman ===
The area welcomed the wave of immigrants fleeing the Spanish Civil War, and was one of the first areas to absorb the Afro-Caribbeans from the Empire Windrush. The availability of cheap rooms also attracted Peter Rachman, who became notorious for exploiting the poor. On 29 August 1958, a marital argument outside a public house by Latimer Road station triggered the 1958 Notting Hill race riots, which were centred on White City and Blechynden Street.

=== Construction of current buildings ===
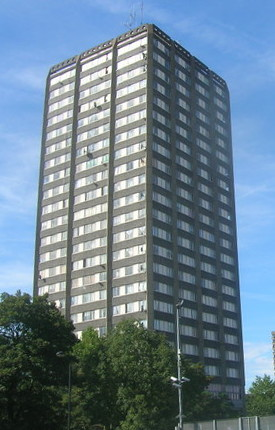
Grenfell Tower, Lancaster West Estate, in 2009

Plans were made in the 1960s to replace the substandard housing in Notting Dale. This would displace 3,000 people, who were to be accommodated in the Lancaster West Estate scheme. This was to have included an office complex and a shopping centre, but they were never built. The master plan was drawn up by the architect Peter Deakins who had, a few years before, been involved in the design and construction of Golden Lane Housing by Chamberlin Powell & Bon as well as the first design stages of The Barbican also by Chamberlin Powell & Bon.

The original scheme was intended to link Latimer Road Underground station with workplaces, shops, offices and amenities in addition to considerable new housing whilst subordinating car-storage, but when these intentions were blocked, a later concept of the estate continued with the idea of raised streets with pedestrian access running along a walkway with vehicular access below at a basement level. Three "finger blocks" – Testerton, Hurstway and Barandon Walks, three- and four-storey linear residential blocks – radiated 150m south from a shopping piazza, with a tower block included to the north to increase the housing density. In the main this was what was built. The finger blocks enclosed two large green spaces. The area to the immediate east of the tower is Lancaster Green and there are children's play areas to the immediate west.

By the time phase one was completed, the philosophy of public housing had changed, and raised walkways were abandoned and further development was conducted by the council's in-house architects using generic designs.

=== Reputation ===
Focus shifted again from addressing the housing need to one of crime prevention, as the new flats soon became known for anti-social behaviour and crime. Indeed, by the mid-1980s, it was perceived as one of the most dangerous parts of Notting Hill at Carnival time.

Of the estate's problems, it was suggested that 'many of them [were] drug related,' and in the 1990s the estate also suffered from gun violence, with, for example, a Metropolitan Police patrol being shot at after using the underground car park servicing the Grenfell Tower in February 1993. In an attempt to bring residents together, during a time of racial tensions, the Catholic Archbishop of Westminster, Basil Hume, in 1979, personally led a Good Friday service in the shadow of the tower block.

As a result of these concerns, modifications were made to access arrangements to the finger block and Grenfell Tower. Where previously the internal walkways to the fingerblocks allowed through-access, they were divided so each flat only had one point of entry. Similarly, the Grenfell Tower had two means of entrance and escape, this was reduced to one that led through a cramped lobby.

=== Re-styling and modernisation ===
The parking provision was no longer needed and the spaces under Barandon Walk were reconfigured as business units. The "Baseline Business Studios" are entered from Whitchurch Road. There are 34 single 330 sq m units and 6 double units. Among the tenants is the North Kensington Law Centre, the UK's first law centre (1970) that specialises in the areas of civil law most relevant to disadvantaged communities.

Land became increasingly valuable in North Kensington, and part of the plot north of Grenfell Walk was allocated to the Kensington Aldridge Academy and then for a redesigned Kensington Leisure Centre. Government energy targets forced authorities to re-examine the energy efficiency of their buildings, and affordable housing targets forced them to look for additional ways of adding accommodation to existing buildings. This, and the recurrent failure of the district heating system serving the finger blocks, resulted in 2015 in the Grenfell tower being modernised, reglazed, insulated and clad in a highly-flammable aluminium sheet material.

== Construction ==
Clifford Wearden & Associate (Peter Deakins) produced the Fourth Report on the scheme in 1964. This had drawings by the architectural draughtsman Maurice Eskanazi. It included an office complex and a shopping centre which were never built.

Architect Peter Deakins (who had worked on Golden Lane Estate and the Barbican Estate before coming to the architectural practice of Clifford Wearden) was involved in the initial masterplan and detailed design discussions with various Authorities and Government Departments. He also represented the Practice at the subsequent Public Enquiry for Site Purchases. The tower block was envisaged as being built the other side of, and including a new Latimer Road station. Transport for London did not understand any possible commercial benefit or wish to be involved, whilst the Borough engineer objected to existing roads being 'decked'. Other bodies withdrew from the scheme.

Another consideration was the structural integrity of the tower block; architects and the public were reeling from the structural collapse at Ronan Point in 1968 where slab walls were designed to support the floor above, and had failed.

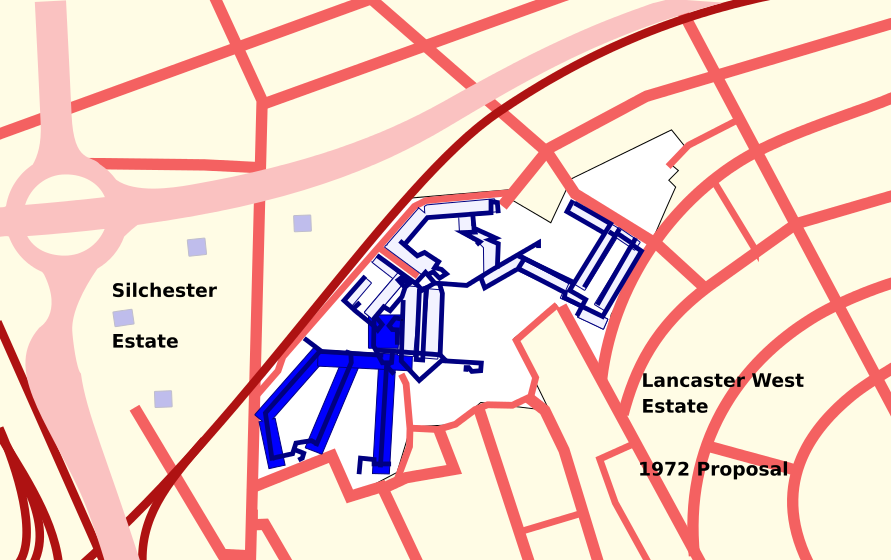
Site plan of the 1972 proposals for the estate connected with walkways at first floor level. The finger blocks with the internal walkways and Grenfell Tower were completed.

Phase 1 was approved in 1970 and construction of the Grenfell Tower, by contractors A.E. Symes, of Leyton, London, commenced in 1972, with the building being completed in 1974.

The further three blocks, Hurstway Walk, Testerton Walk and Barandon Walk, were low rise. They were designed by Ken Price and Derek Latham, and residents approved of the high quality of detailing.

After phase 1 was completed, the overall concept was abandoned: the further blocks Camelford Walk, Clarendon Walk to the east and Treadgold House were built by in-house architects. The connecting first floor walkways, that were so integral to the design, were never built.

=== Grenfell Tower ===
The 67.30-metre (220 ft 10 in) tall building contained 120 one- and two-bedroom flats (six dwellings per floor on twenty of the twenty-four stories, with the other four being used for non-residential purposes), housing up to 600 people. It was designed by Nigel Whitbread.

=== Finger blocks ===
To achieve the required density LCC architects favoured tower blocks set in green space as can be seen in the neighbouring Silchester Estate, the Clifford Wearden & Associates architects propose a solution of densely packed low-rise apartments with landscaped greenspace. The finger block was seen as a tower block laid on its side- instead of lifts and service shafts there was the internal walkway. It was intended to keep the housing as compact as possible thus freeing up more green space in between. The units were of different sizes and slotted together like lego blocks. The finger blocks were built above garages on a deck, along the centre of the deck was a covered walkway, which provided the street in the sky. On either side of the street were flats and the stair columns that rose to the flats above. The flats themselves were grouped in blocks and projected, joining over the walkway. The finger blocks were very close to the annual disturbances in Notting Hill, and the walkways provided escape routes that the police were unable to control. In 1992, the finger blocks were refurbished and walls were erected that segmented the walkways and required pass key access - destroying the original design concept and one of the finger blocks' unique features.

=== Architects ===
- Clifford Wearden: described as the 'godfather of the project', he, with Peter Deakins, was responsible for the overall layout of the estate. He was born in Preston; his father was a plumber and his mother ran a café. Clifford studied architecture at the University of Liverpool from 1938 to 1940 and 1946 to 48, where he was interested in social housing. Heb spent the war years in the Air Force. From 1949 to 1954, Clifford was chief-partner for Sir Basil Spence, and when they got the commission for rebuilding Coventry Cathedral he was responsible for preserving the ruins. He moved to London and set up his own practice in Homer Street Marylebone. He took his children to watch the house being fired and demolished for the film Leo the Last. He got the contract for designing the estate. The tower block was a necessity, and a good building but he felt strongly that vertical living was not right.
- Peter Deakins: then in Partnership with Clifford Wearden, Peter Deakins was responsible for the original Masterplan for the Lancaster Road (West) Estate in the early 1960s. Lifts in what was to become Grenfell Tower were intended to be used for access to an upgraded and much improved Latymer Road Station. The scheme – described as a 'Splendid Surprise' – was illustrated in the January 1966 'Preview' edition of the Architectural Review. Very many of the ideas were, for various reasons and despite retaining interesting features, later abandoned to be replaced by a much more conventional 'Council Scheme'.
- Nigel Whitbread: was lead architect for the Grenfell Tower. He was born in Kenton, his parents had a grocers shop on St Helen's Gardens, North Kensington. He was educated at Sloane Grammar school and then got a position with the architects Douglas Stephen and Partners, who though small were applying the principles of Le Corbusier and the modernists. He worked alongside Kenneth Frampton who was the technical editor of the journal Architectural Design; and Elia Zenghelis and Bob Maxwell. He moved to work for Clifford Wearden after the basic plan for Lancaster West had been established. He later worked for 30 years until his retirement at Aukett Associates. He recently became involved with local residents association drawing up the St Quintin and Woodlands Neighbourhood Plan. This included the Imperial West site in Hammersmith and Fulham.
- Derek Latham: Assisted with the finger blocks. 1973 thesis: Community Survival in the Renewal Process – An integral part of the housing problem. He was an active member of shelter fighting to help families from the demolished slums to be rehoused in the same area. Tower blocks were the established high density solution to social housing, he aimed to recreate the scale and community of a Georgian London square. The finger block was seen as a tower block laid on its side.
- Ken Price: was lead architect for the finger blocks. He was from Derby, and educated at Nottingham School of Architecture. He joined the project after the basic design had been penned, and his skill was arranging the flats and maisonettes so they all had maximum interior space, a balcony or individual roof terrace. Today disability access would have been a problem. The bricks were commissioned from the brick manufacturer Ockley- they were metric bricks 300 mm in length. Alison and Peter Smithson’s Robin Hood Gardens estate was an unconscious influence as was Darbourne and Darke's Lillington Gardens estate just off Vauxhall Bridge Road.
- Michael Brown (landscape architect, 1923–1996)

=== Typography and signage ===
The practice of Kinneir Calvert was chosen to design the signage for the estate and the World's End Estate in Chelsea. Kinneir Calvert designed the British road sign system. The job involved not just the signing but given the complexity of horizontal and vertical streets intersecting, working out the most efficient addressing system for the benefit of the postmen and residents. The task was managed be Andrew Haig. The signs used a slab serif version of Margaret Calvert's Rail font, which was later called Calvert and used on the Tyne and Wear Metro in 1980.

== Grenfell Tower Fire ==
In the early hours of the morning of 14 June 2017, a fire at the Grenfell Tower engulfed the building, killing at least seventy-two residents, although it was speculated by many at the time including emergency responders and members of the local community speculated that the number was likely to be higher than could be identified.

It was later accepted that although the official number of deaths (which could only be attributed to those who were identifiable by found remains) stood at 72, there was no definitive way of ascertaining a definite number of casualties due to the intensity and nature of the fire.

Two of the youngest victims were babies; a six month old child was later found by recovery teams in the arms of her deceased mother and another, due to be born two months later, was stillborn on the night of the fire while his mother received emergency treatment for smoke inhalation. It was speculated even whilst events were unfolding that a recent refurbishment of the block had, through the flammable cladding panels that were added to the exterior, contributed to the speed of engulfment of the whole building.

An official Government enquiry is ongoing into what caused the rapid spread of the fire and how the 2015 renovation of Grenfell Tower contributed to the failure of the building's fire containment capacities and thus caused so many casualties, with many media publications and the Metropolitan Police arguing there are considerable grounds for charges of Corporate Manslaughter to be made.

== Politics and government ==
Lancaster West Estate is governed by Kensington and Chelsea London Borough Council.

Lancaster West Estate is part of the Kensington and Bayswater constituency for elections to the House of Commons of the United Kingdom. Since the 2024 general election, the local Member of Parliament (MP) has been Joe Powell from the Labour Party.

== Notable residents ==
- Les Ferdinand, footballer

== Media ==
John Boorman's 1970 film Leo the Last was shot in the area, before it was redeveloped, and while it was still a slum, a fact which is central to the film. The principal street location of the film was Testerton Street, and its Southern junction with Barandon Street, although its Northern junction with Blechyden Street, where Grenfell Tower currently stands, is visible in some shots. Kidulthood (2006) and Adulthood (2008), written and directed by British filmmaker Noel Clarke, were partially filmed on the estate.

== See also ==
- Lakanal House fire
