= Michael Day (cricketer) =

Australian cricketer

Personal information
- Full name: Michael David Day
- Born: 7 August 1974 (age 52); Liverpool, New South Wales
- Batting: Right-handed
- Bowling: Slow left-arm orthodox

Domestic team information
- Years: Team
- 1999/2000: ACT Comets

Career statistics
Competition	List A
Matches	1
Runs scored	18
Batting average	18.00
100s/50s	0/0
Top score	18
Balls bowled	48
Wickets	0
Bowling average	–
5 wickets in innings	–
10 wickets in match	–
Best bowling	–
Catches/stumpings	0/–
- Source: CricketArchive, 10 April 2023

Michael David Day (born 7 August 1974) is a former cricketer who played List A cricket for the ACT Comets in the Mercantile Mutual Cup.

His only List A appearance for the Comets came in the 1999/00 domestic season, against Queensland at Manuka Oval. The Comets won the toss and bowled first, with Day bowling eight overs of spin for 41 runs, as both Matthew Hayden and Jimmy Maher dominated with a 250 run opening stand. In the run chase he batted at nine and scored a quick 18, with one six, before being bowled by Andrew Symonds. Queensland won the match by 26 runs.

Day has also played in England's Liverpool and District league.
