= Barking fire =

2019 fire in east London

Coordinates: 51.52208°N 0.10431°E

The Barking fire was a structure fire that occurred on 9 June 2019 at a newly built six storey block of flats named Samuel Garside House, located in De Pass Gardens, Barking, London, the United Kingdom.

== Background ==
Samuel Garside House is part of Barking Riverside. The six storey block was built by Bellway Homes, and sold on to a private landlord, Adriatic Land 3 (GR1) Limited, an investment vehicle created by fund manager Longharbour.

Residents had complained that the use of wood on the flats was unsafe. The developer, Bellway Homes, assured them that the wood cladding was fire retardant.

Peter Mason, chair of the Barking Reach residents' association contacted the builder in May 2019 to ask for the fire risk to be investigated after watching a BBC Watchdog report that highlighted fire safety problems at two other developments. He was told via e-mail not to worry, as the construction method was different to the ones in the report.

== Fire ==
The fire started at 3.30 pm, 9 June 2019 at a newly built six storey block of flats named Samuel Garside House, located in De Pass Gardens, Barking, London, United Kingdom. The developers believe the fire to have been started by a fallen-over barbecue on a fourth floor balcony. It spread rapidly engulfing the wooded balconies. Residents stated afterwards that the fire alarm was not triggered, nor did the sprinkler system activate. Residents informed their neighbours by banging on doors. The fire brigade attended and initially were hampered by finding a water supply. They deployed 15 fire engines and around 100 firefighters. The fire was declared to be under control at 6.30 pm. Ten flats were completely destroyed and 43 had varying levels of damage caused by the fire.

There were no deaths or serious injuries; two residents were treated for smoke inhalation.

== Investigation ==
Barking and Dagenham Council commissioned a review of the Samuel Garside House fire, and a report was published in January 2021. An independent, resident-led inquiry was conducted under the lead of the Barking Reach Residents' Association and a report was published on 10 May 2020. It included, among others, a testimony from a fire safety expert, Dr Jonathan Evans.

According to Inside Housing magazine, a report prepared by Osterna for the building managers RMG had said the external cladding, wooden joists and deck balconies were "a significant hazard" and recommended both that a responsible person should check whether the wood had been appropriately treated and that the residents should be advised not to use barbecues on the balconies. The builders Bellway Homes claimed not to have seen that report before the fire. An investigation of other blocks post fire found 'faulty fire doors, broken smoke alarms and combustible cladding', while the original developer Bellway said fire protection measures inside 'received all regulatory approvals' and 'ensured occupants were safely evacuated'.

Also according to Inside Housing the material used for the cladding and decking was ThermoWood, which was banned for use on buildings over 18 metres high (these flats being 13.75m high) and has a class D rating. Inside Housing found twenty low rise developments where its use had been authorised.

== Aftermath ==
As a consequence of the fire, the wooden balconies and elevation fragments have been replaced on both Samuel Garside House, and its twin block on the same estate, Ernest Websdale House.

The event has featured in many reports and articles highlighting the lack of fire safety improvements and remediation following the Grenfell Tower fire.

== See also ==
- Grenfell Tower fire
- Cladding
