= Barry Quirk =

Barry Quirk CBE is Chief Executive of Kensington and Chelsea Borough Council (previously Chief Executive of Lewisham Council) and co-chaired the Design Commission's report 'Restarting Britain 2: meeting needs, saving money, humanising services, engaging citizens'.

== Background ==
Barry Quirk has a PhD in political and social geography and is an author and regular lecturer on localism, public policy and public management. According to Quirk's 2011 book, Re-imagining government: public leadership in challenging times, there are three key purposes of government: the necessity of solving community problems, securing welfare and having the legitimacy to determine common good. He argues that this legitimacy comes from discussion between leaders and communities, based on five core ethical principles. These can be paraphrased as treating people according to their own wants and intentions, letting them choose for themselves, empathising with them, helping them if it is possible to do so without wasting that effort, and encouraging them to help each other through reciprocal arrangements - a set of ethical principles he attributes to philosopher Iain King.

He was Chief Executive at Lewisham since November 1993, and once described by Geoff Mulgan as a 'seasoned public service leader'. He has worked in local government for over 35 years, with experience in five London councils. He is a leading local government chief executive nationally, involved in the improvement of public services across London and the UK. From 2004 to 2009, Barry was appointed by Government to be the National Efficiency Champion for English local government. In 2007 he produced a landmark report for Government on the potential transfer of public assets to community groups.

In 2013, he co-chaired a comprehensive manifesto for the redesign of public services in Britain.

Following the June 2017 Grenfell Tower fire in North Kensington (and the resignation of the CEO of the Kensington and Chelsea Borough Council on 21 June), Quirk was seconded as CEO of KCBC to stabilise that council in the aftermath. In September 2017 he resigned from his post in Lewisham to become CEO of KCBC on a permanent basis. About the Grenfell disaster, Quirk said "I think people should continue to advocate for the interests of survivors who haven’t yet been housed. I’ve got no problem with their impatience. They should be impatient. It’s terrible that we have a situation where we haven’t found properties that are suitable. A lot of that is about scarcity. But I don’t achieve anything by making impractical, infeasible demands on our own organisation."
