= North Kensington =

Neighbourhood of west London

Coordinates: 51.523792°N 0.219598°W

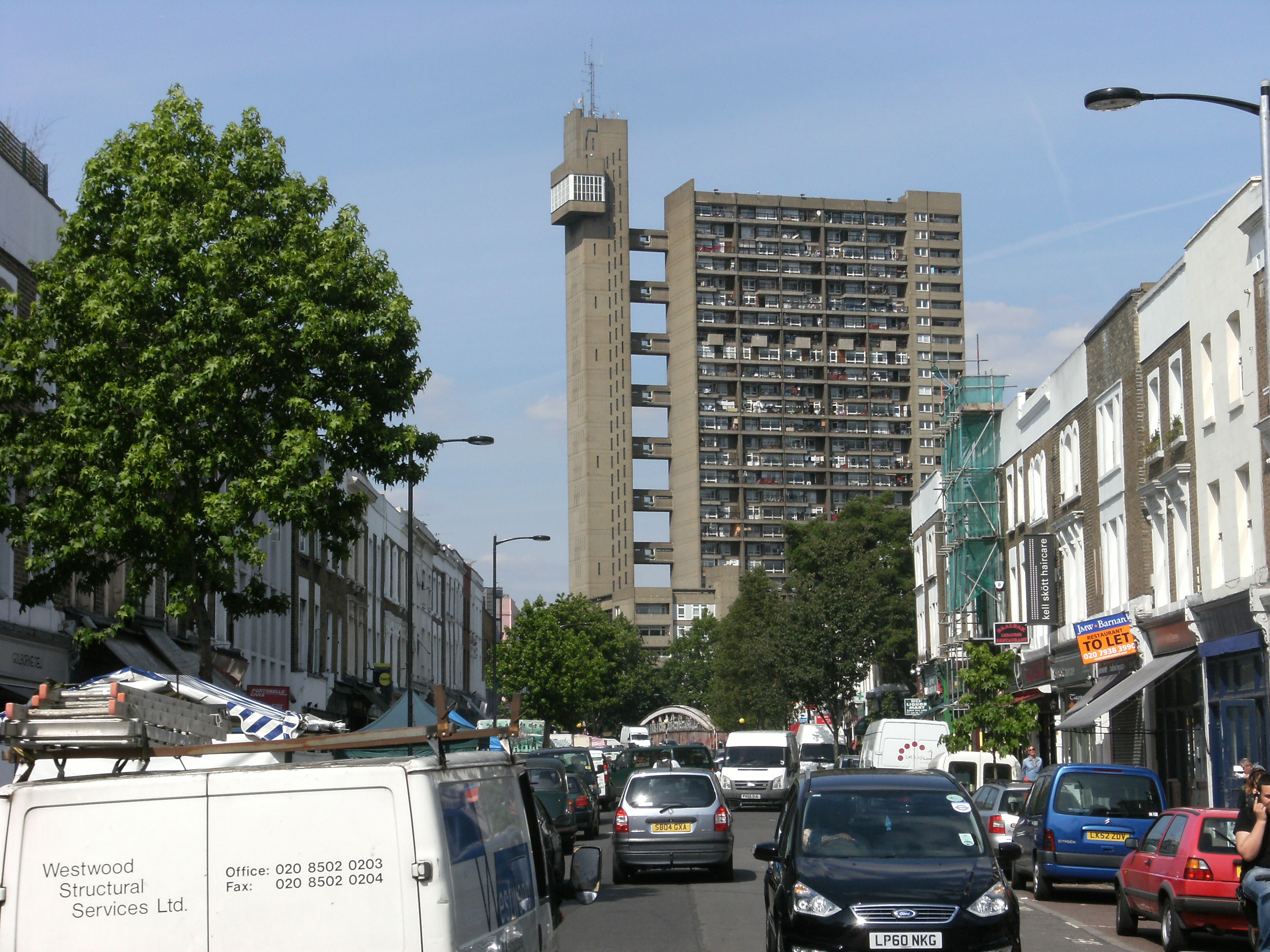
- Trellick Tower from Golborne Road

- Location within Greater London
- OS grid reference: TQ255795
- London borough: Kensington & Chelsea; Brent
- Ceremonial county: Greater London
- Region: London
- Country: England
- Sovereign state: United Kingdom
- Post town: LONDON
- Postcode district: W10, W11, W14
- Postcode district: NW10
- Dialling code: 020
- Police: Metropolitan
- Fire: London
- Ambulance: London
- UK Parliament: Kensington and Bayswater
- London Assembly: West Central; Brent and Harrow

North Kensington is an area of west London. It is north of Notting Hill and south of Kensal Green predominantly in the Royal Borough of Kensington and Chelsea and partly in the London Borough of Brent and City of Westminster. The names North Kensington and Ladbroke Grove describe the same area.

North Kensington is where most of the violence of the Notting Hill race riots of 1958 occurred, and where the Notting Hill Carnival started. Ladbroke Grove tube station was called Notting Hill from its opening in 1864 until 1880, and Notting Hill and Ladbroke Grove between then and 1919, when it was renamed Ladbroke Grove (North Kensington). It acquired its current name in 1938. The area was also once served by St. Quintin Park and Wormwood Scrubs railway station, until it closed in 1940.

North Kensington was once known for its slum housing, but housing prices have now risen and the area on the whole is considered exclusive and upmarket, although expensive residences are interspersed with lower-income areas like the Lancaster West Estate.

== Crossrail ==
Just to the east of the Old Oak Common site, Kensington and Chelsea Council has been pushing for a station at North Kensington/Kensal off Ladbroke Grove and Canal Way, as a turn-back facility will have to be built in the area anyway. Siting it at Kensal Green, rather than next to Paddington itself, would provide a new station to regenerate the area. Amongst the general public there is a huge amount of support for the project and Mayor Boris Johnson stated that a station would be added if it did not increase Crossrail's overall cost; in response, Kensington and Chelsea Council agreed to underwrite the projected £33 million cost of a Crossrail station, which was received very well by the residents of the borough. TfL is conducting a feasibility study on the station and the project is backed by National Grid, retailers Sainsbury's and Cath Kidston, and Jenny Jones (Green Party member of the London Assembly).

== Grenfell Tower fire ==
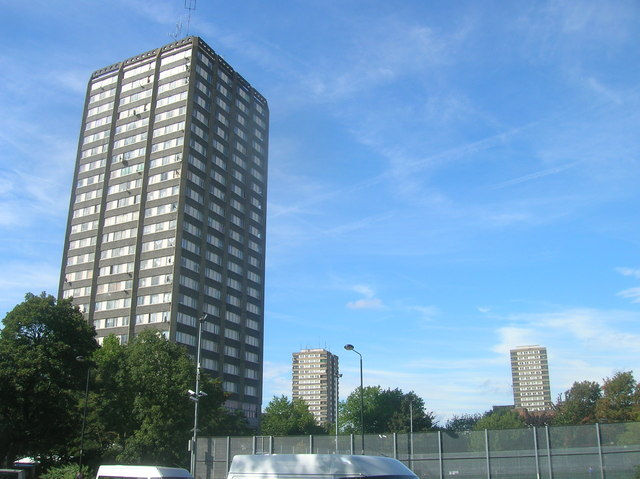
Grenfell Tower (left) in 2009

Grenfell Tower on the Lancaster West Estate in North Kensington was destroyed by fire in the early hours of 14 June 2017. The fire killed 72 people and was the subject of a public inquiry.

== Notable residents and natives ==
- Joss Ackland, actor, was born in North Kensington on 29 February 1928.
- David Cameron, former Prime Minister and leader of the Conservative Party, resides in North Kensington.
- Nick Clarke, radio and television presenter and journalist, lived and died in North Kensington.
- Michael Day, paleoanthrolopologist
- Danny Dichio, footballer, grew up in North Kensington.
- Alan Johnson (born 1950), British Labour Party politician and former Home Secretary, author of the autobiography This Boy: A Memoir of a Childhood, lived in Southam Street in North Kensington as a child.
