= DeBruce Grain Elevator explosion =

1998 industrial accident in Kansas, US

DeBruce Grain Elevator explosion and rescue operation
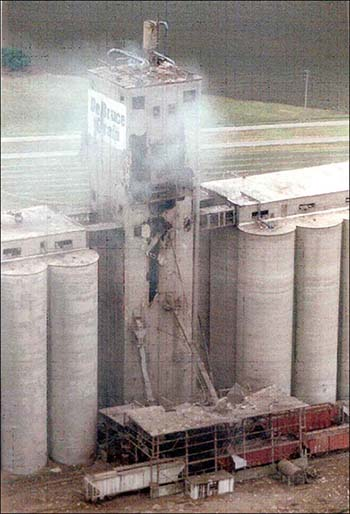
- Aerial view of the damage to the headhouse of the grain elevator
- Date: June 8, 1998
- Time: 9:18 AM CST
- Location: Wichita, Kansas, USA; 37.587792°N 97.413740°W
- Type: Dust explosion
- Cause: Multiple factors
- Deaths: 7
- Injuries: 10

On June 8, 1998, at 9:18 AM CST a series of dust explosions occurred at the DeBruce Grain Elevator near Wichita, Kansas, US, resulting in the deaths of seven workers and trapped ten others. The disaster led to significant changes to safety practices in agriculture in the United States and led to the creation of OSHA's Grain Elevator Explosion Investigation Team.

== Background ==
The DeBruce Grain Elevator was constructed between 1953 and 1955 by Chalmers & Borton for the Garvey Grain Company. It is located approximately 4 mi (6.4 km) southwest of the city of Wichita. At the time of the accident it was the largest grain elevator in the world, being 2,716 ft (828 m) long with a total of 310 grain storage silos (246 circular grain silos and 164 interstice grain silos). Prior to the explosions, the south gallery—the name for the structure above grain silos that features conveyor belts—had just been cleaned, while the north gallery had not. At the time of the accident there were 20 workers on the property, 11 working for the DeBruce Grain Company, 9 working for Labor Source Incorporated, 3 working for Industrial Maintenance Inc., 2 working for Dusenbery Trucking, 1 working for Lange Company, and 1 working for Rob Heimerman Trucking.

== Accident ==
The believed origin of the explosion was when a lack of lubrication caused a roller bearing to stop, locking the roller into a static position while the conveyor belt continued rolling over it, heating up and igniting the accumulated grain dust inside the roller. The unsafe amount of grain dust throughout the elevator led to a rapid spread of the explosion, where it travelled to the head house and then shot in both directions through the north and south galleries. The damage to the north gallery was minimal due to its recent cleaning, while the damage to the south gallery was much more catastrophic, where the explosion continued through empty silos into the basement. Casualties exclusively occurred in the south array and the head house, where the explosions caused the most damage. With four fatalities occurring within the west tunnel of the south array, another fatality and four injuries occurring outside the south array, one injury inside the south gallery, one fatality and one injury outside the east face of the head house, and one fatality and five injuries inside the head house itself. Ten others on site were not injured or trapped in the accident.

== Victims ==
The seven men who died in the accident were as follows:

DeBruce Grain workers

- Howard Going, 65
- Jose Luise Duarte, 41
- Lanny Owen, 43

LSI workers

- Jose Prajedes Ortiz, 24
- Noel Najera, 25
- Raymundo Diaz-Vela, 23
- Victor Manuel Castaneda, 26

== Rescue operation ==
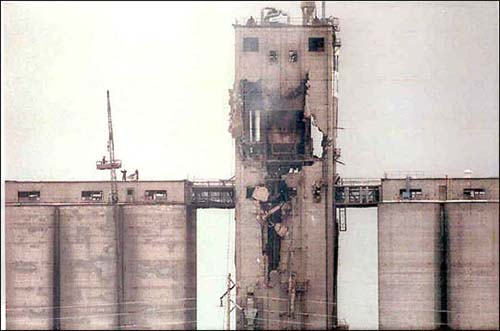
the Sedgwick County fire rescue team using a borrowed crane to rescue trapped workers

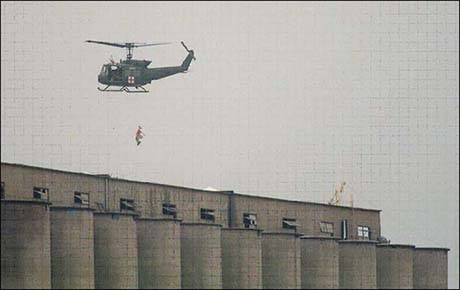
a US Army Huey helicopter from Fort Riley rescues worker David Pickens from the gallery roof

First responders arrived within ten minutes of the explosion, survivors climbed and were helped up to the silo tops where a crane borrowed from a local company was used by Sedgwick County fire rescue to lower them to the ground. At one point a US Army helicopter from nearby Fort Riley was used to lift an injured worker from the gallery roof of the south array. Rescues on the first day took about four hours. The next day, with workers still missing, US President Bill Clinton declared the accident a federal emergency, which allowed FEMA to assist in the rescue and recovery operations. 20 trained searchers and 42 support personnel were sent to help local crews by FEMA. The last missing worker was recovered deceased five weeks after the accident.

== Aftermath ==
The investigation was led by OSHA's newly created Grain Elevator Explosion Investigation Team, whose investigators arrived two weeks following the accident. The team collected and analyzed physical evidence as well as witness testimony. It was determined that excessive accumulations of grain dust were the primary cause of the explosion. Due to the inevitable generation of highly-explosive grain dust within grain elevators, constant dust removal is required. At the DeBruce Grain Elevator, dust was collected and placed back into the grain handling system. This practice was widely recognized within the grain industry as hazardous. Furthermore, although the facility contained a number of pneumatic dust control systems, none of these systems were functioning as intended at the time of the explosion. In February, 2001, DeBruce Grain agreed to pay $685,000 in fines while admitting no fault. In 2010, DeBruce was purchased by Viterra, and the grain elevator remains in operation today.

== See also ==
- Port Colborne explosion
- 2008 Georgia Imperial Sugar refinery explosion
- Great Mill Disaster
- Occupational safety and health
