= Telangana chemical factory explosion =

2025 factory fire in Telangana, India

2025 Telangana chemical factory explosion
- chemical factory explosion (Telangana) chemical factory explosion (India)
- Date: 30 June 2025
- Time: c. 9:00 a.m. IST
- Location: Sigachi Industries Ltd factory, Pashamylaram, Sangareddy, Telangana, India; 17°32′19.3″N 78°11′35.5″E
- Type: Chemical explosion
- Deaths: 46
- Injuries: 33
- Missing: 8

On 30 June 2025, a fire broke out following the explosion of a building housing the reactor unit at a chemical factory in Pashamylaram, Sangareddy district, India, killing 46 people and injuring 33. The likely cause was a dust explosion.

== Incident ==
The incident occurred at a factory owned by Sigachi Industries Limited in Telangana, India. The plant produced microcrystalline cellulose (MCC), a binding compound used in making pharmaceuticals, and represented a fourth of the company's manufacturing capacity.

The factory’s spray dryer unit, which was used to process raw material into fine powder, exploded around 9 a.m IST, leading to a complete collapse of the building and severe damage to nearby structures. The explosion happened during working hours, with over 140 people in the building, killing 46 people and injuring another 33. Eight people remained missing as of 18 July. Due to the severity of the burns, DNA testing was conducted to identify the deceased. The explosion is considered to be Telangana's worst industrial disaster.

== Reactions ==
Both Prime Minister Narendra Modi and Telangana chief minister Revanth Reddy announced compensation of ₹200,000 (US$2,100) to each of the deceased victims' families and ₹50,000 (US$520) to each of the injured. Odisha chief minister Mohan Charan Majhi announced a ₹1,000,000 (US$10,000) payment to the families of each of the eight workers from Odisha that were killed in the blast. A government panel was formed to investigate the incident.

Sigachi Industries said it would pay ₹10,000,000 (US$100,000) to the families of each victim, and would pay for medical support for the injured.

== Investigation ==
The company denied that the incident was caused by a reactor explosion, as this terminology implies a chemical or nuclear explosion. However, although MCC is not chemically hazardous, it is combustible and thus, in fine powder form, can cause a major dust explosion, like many other everyday materials, such as flour, grain and sugar (see 2008 Georgia Imperial Sugar refinery explosion). Dust explosions may occur where fine powder has been allowed to accumulate in factory open spaces, as at Georgia, or inside hidden areas such as ductwork, as in the West Pharmaceutical Services explosion.

Operations at the factory were halted for 90 days due to significant damage to equipment and structures at the plant. By the next day, shares of Sigachi industries had fallen 18%.

A case was filed against the management of Sigachi Industries and the company announced it would carry out a thorough site assessment. According to the complaint filed by a victim's family member, workers had repeatedly raised concerns with management regarding the use of outdated equipment, but their concerns were ignored. According to the Telangana Fire Department, the plant lacked adequate safety measures, including fire alarms and heat sensors.

== See also ==
- List of explosions
- Atchutapuram pharmaceutical factory explosion
- Hapur chemical plant explosion
- 2008 Georgia Imperial Sugar refinery explosion
- West Pharmaceutical Services explosion
