= EnVISIONing Annapolis =

EnVISIONing Annapolis was a privately funded lecture series and visioning charrette for Annapolis, Maryland, that aimed to generate dialogue on responsible, long-term development of the city. Activities for enVISIONing Annapolis ran from 2007 through 2008. The organization backing the process, the EnVISIONing Annapolis Foundation, was formed solely for this purpose. Important contributors and co-sponsors include the University of Maryland, Annapolis Charter 300, and St. John's College. The primary organizers of the project included MS&R Architects (Garth Rockcastle and Troy Urman), Miriam Gusevich, and Glenn Smith.

== Conversations for Change Lecture Series ==
The EnVISIONing Annapolis project began with a series of free, public lectures held in Annapolis from September 2007 through June 2008. The speakers included leading experts in the fields of urban planning, urban design, public transportation, immigration, and historic preservation. Organized by the EnVISIONing Annapolis Foundation, MS&R and Miriam Gusevich, these lectures were intended to stimulate civic dialogue among residents and outsiders regarding the urban sprawl and development issues facing the 21st-century American city. All lectures were held at the Maryland Hall Center for Creative Arts, with one exception held at The Boys and Girls Club of Annapolis.

Speakers included: Notable author and international consultant Charles Landry; Jason Sartori from the National Center for Smart Growth; Architect/educator William Morrish, and; Preservation author and thinker Howard Mansfield. Each lecturer addressed topics of their specialty—all relevant to Annapolis's situation today. The purpose of these lectures was not to propose solutions, per se, but rather to instigate a local conversation on potential solutions from the ground up, supported by Annapolitans.

== Urban Design Charrette ==
A major component of EnVISIONing Annapolis was the urban design charrette held in March 2008. During this period of intense collaborative work, four university teams—one each from the University of Maryland, Catholic University of America, Virginia Tech, and Morgan State University—converged on the city to study, brainstorm, and create. Each team conceived and presented compelling plans, narratives, and images of the city in the year 2060—envisioning the future of Annapolis.

Directing and facilitating the charrette teams were Garth Rockcastle, Principal, and Troy Urman, Intern, of architectural firm Meyer, Scherer, and Rockcastle, Ltd. The firm is noted for its many institutional projects, as well as the award-winning Washburn "A" Mill or Mill City Museum and headquarters for Urban Outfitters at the Navy Yard in Philadelphia. Also integral to the planning team was Miriam Gusevich.

The products of this working session were re-presented at an open public session hosted by the Institute for the Future at Anne Arundel Community College on April 19, 2008. The projects were illustrated with renderings, 3d models, diagrams, and policy or building proposals and feedback received by attendant surveys and discussion. A final report is posted on the IF @ ACC website for public view

== Post-Charrette Workshop and Report ==
A group of Loeb Fellows (alumni of Harvard University's one year Loeb program) led by Miriam Gusevich and Glenn Smith came to Annapolis in June 2008. They held a workshop session to discuss and remark upon the work of the charrette and offer suggestions for next steps Annapolitans might take in moving this effort forward. Some local groups are continuing in pursuing some of the concepts proposed during this design effort, via feasibility studies and community activism. This effort was made possible with a grant from the Loeb Fellowship.
