= Mill City Museum =

Museum in Minneapolis, Minnesota, USA

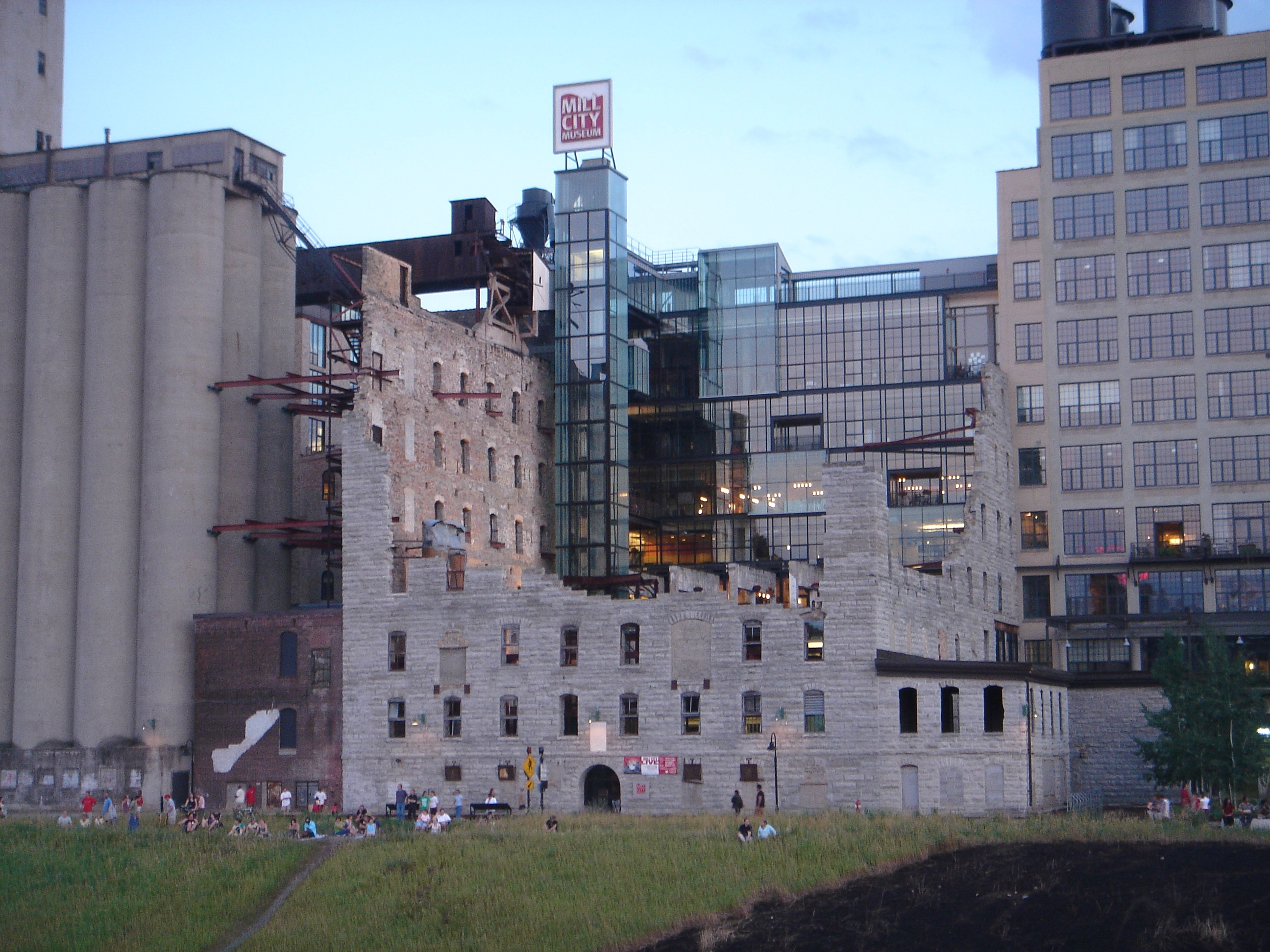
- Established: 2003
- Location: 704 South 2nd Street; Minneapolis, Minnesota, USA
- Coordinates: 44.97938°N 93.25711°W
- Type: History Museum
- Director: David Stevens
- Owner: Minnesota Historical Society
- Public transit access: Bus Routes 3, 7 and 22, METRO Blue Line, METRO Green Line
- Website: www.mnhs.org/millcity
- Washburn A Mill Complex
- U.S. National Register of Historic Places
- U.S. National Historic Landmark
- U.S. Historic district – Contributing property
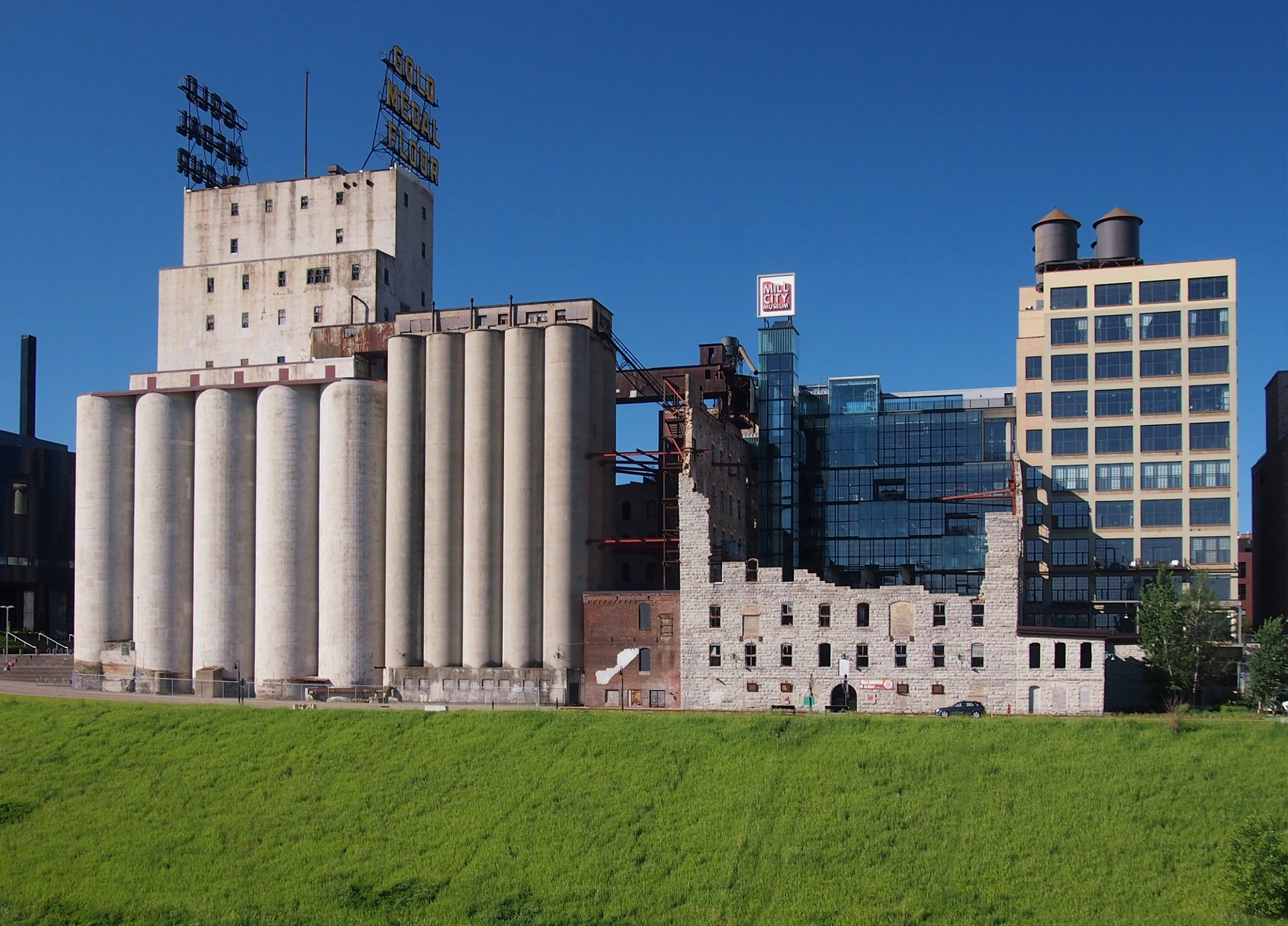
- The Washburn A Mill Complex from the Stone Arch Bridge
- Location: 1st St. S. at Portland Ave. Minneapolis
- Built: 1879
- Part of: Saint Anthony Falls Historic District (ID71000438)
- NRHP reference No.: 83004388

Significant dates
- Added to NRHP: May 4, 1983
- Designated NHL: May 4, 1983

Mill City Museum is a museum in Minneapolis, Minnesota, United States. It is affiliated with the Minnesota Historical Society.

The museum is located in the ruins of the Washburn "A" Mill next to Mill Ruins Park on the banks of the Mississippi River in Minneapolis. The museum, opened in 2003, focuses on the founding and growth of Minneapolis, especially flour milling and the other industries that used hydropower from Saint Anthony Falls. The mill complex that the museum is within, dates from the 1870s and is listed on the National Register of Historic Places. It is also part of the St. Anthony Falls Historic District and within the Mississippi National River and Recreation Area.

== Exhibits ==
The museum features exhibits about the history of Minneapolis, flour milling machinery, a water lab and a baking lab. The centerpiece of the exhibit is the multistory Flour Tower, where visitors sit in the cab of a freight elevator and are taken to different floors of the building, each designed to look like a floor in a working flour mill. Voices of people who worked in the Washburn A Mill are heard throughout the show. Visitors exit on the 8th floor, where extant equipment is interpreted by staff, and are then led to the ninth-floor observation deck to view St. Anthony Falls.

The Gold Medal Flour sign still shines at night atop the adjoining grain elevator. Across the river, the Washburn A Mill's former competitor, the Pillsbury A Mill, is topped with a sign reading "Pillsbury's Best Flour."

=== Local artists ===
The work of local artists is featured throughout the building. Pieces by JoAnn Verburg, Tom Maakestad, Kim Lawler, Kathleen Richert, Paul Wrench and Becky Schurmann include murals, an art glass collage, a 15-foot (4.6 m) Bisquick box, and sculpture.

== Washburn A Mill ==
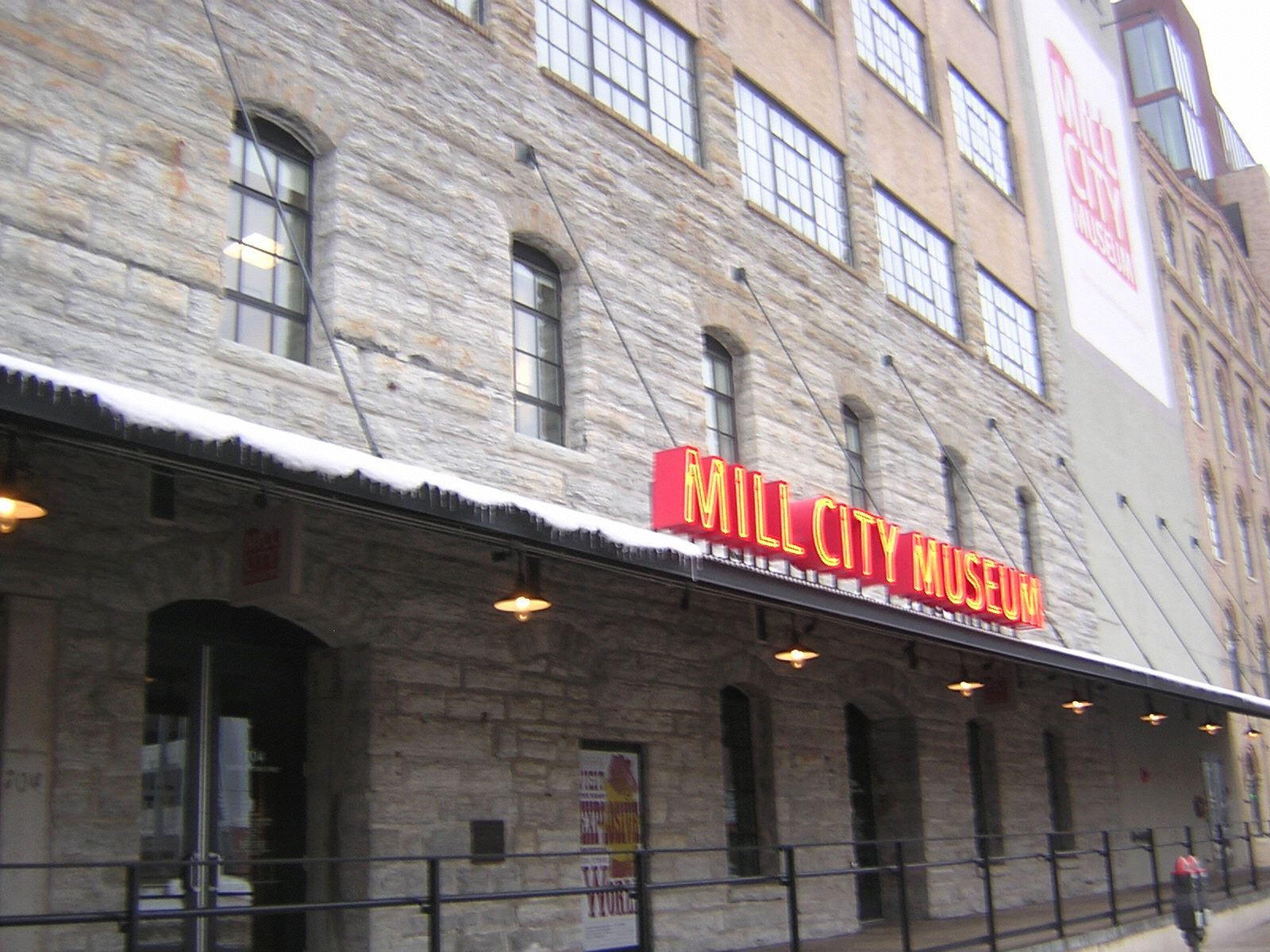
Front of building

The first Washburn A Mill, built by Cadwallader C. Washburn in 1874, was declared the largest flour mill in the world upon its completion, and contributed to the development of Minneapolis. On May 2, 1878, a spark ignited airborne flour dust within the mill, creating an explosion that demolished the Washburn A and killed 14 workers instantly. The ensuing fire resulted in the deaths of four more people, destroyed five other mills, and reduced Minneapolis's milling capacity by one third. Known as the Great Mill Disaster, the explosion made national news and served as a focal point that led to reforms in the milling industry. In order to prevent the buildup of combustible flour dust, ventilation systems and other precautionary devices were installed in mills throughout the country.

By 1880 a new Washburn A Mill, designed by Austrian engineer William de la Barre, opened as the largest flour mill in the world, a designation it retained until the Pillsbury A Mill opened across the river in 1881. At the peak of the Washburn A Mill's production, it could grind over 100 boxcars of wheat into almost two million pounds of flour per day. An ad from the 1870s advertised, "Forty-one Runs of Stone. Capacity, 1,200 Barrels per Day. This is the largest and most complete Mill in the United States, and has not its equal in quantity and quality of machinery for making high and uniform grades of Family Flour in this country." Advertising hyperbole aside, the mill, along with the Pillsbury A Mill and other flour mills powered by St. Anthony Falls, contributed greatly to Minneapolis's development. The mill was designated a National Historic Landmark in 1983 for its technological innovations and its importance in the history of General Mills.

Washburn later teamed up with John Crosby to form the Washburn-Crosby Company, which later became General Mills.

After World War I, flour production in Minneapolis began to decline as flour milling technology no longer depended on water power. Other cities, such as Buffalo, New York, became more prominent in the milling industry. Later on in the mill's lifetime, General Mills started putting more emphasis on producing cereals and baking mixes and shifted away from flour milling. The mill was shut down in 1965, along with eight other of the oldest mills operated by General Mills.

The Mills were mothballed for several years until the Washburn Crosby Mill was leased to the visionary architect Peter Nelson Hall. Based on the fifth floor of the Utility Building (part of the A-Mill complex) while living on the sixth floor, Peter Nelson Hall Architects and his team put together preliminary plans in 1976 that would set in motion the long term vision of the Washburn Crosby Mills as a Minnesota landmark.

In 1991 a fire nearly destroyed the old mill. Fires (and explosions) were a well known hazards for flour mills. The A-Mill had a serious fire in 1928. The mill had a good sprinkler system that very likely would have rapidly ended the fire. But the mill was vacant, thus not heated due to the expense, and the sprinklers were not functioning. During the late 1990s, the city of Minneapolis, through the Minneapolis Community Development Agency, worked to stabilize the mill ruins. After the city had cleared the rubble and reinforced the mill's damaged walls, the Minnesota Historical Society announced plans to construct a milling museum and education center within the ruins. Construction on the museum began in March 2001. Designed by Tom Meyer, principal for the architectural firm Meyer, Scherer & Rockcastle, the museum is a new building built with the ruin walls of the 1880 Washburn A Mill. Efforts were made to retain as much of the historic fabric of the building as was possible. Many features of the Washburn A Mill were left intact, including turbine pits, railroad tracks, a train shed and two engine houses.

== Gallery ==
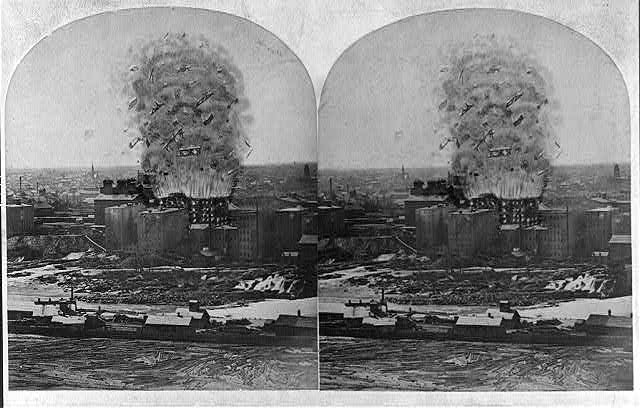
1878 Stereograph rendering of the Great Mill Disaster

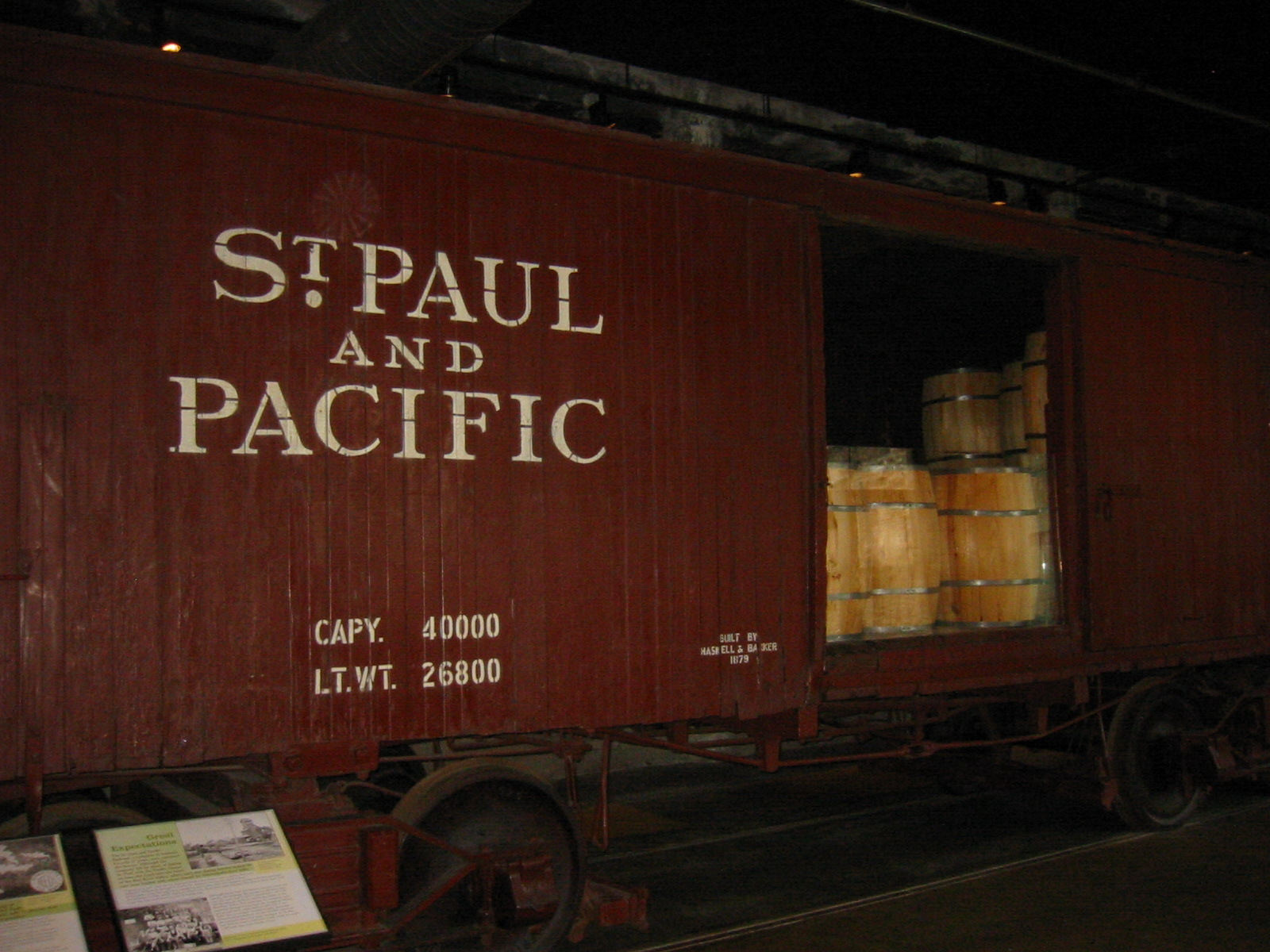
An 1879 boxcar shows how railroads transported wheat to the mills, and flour to market

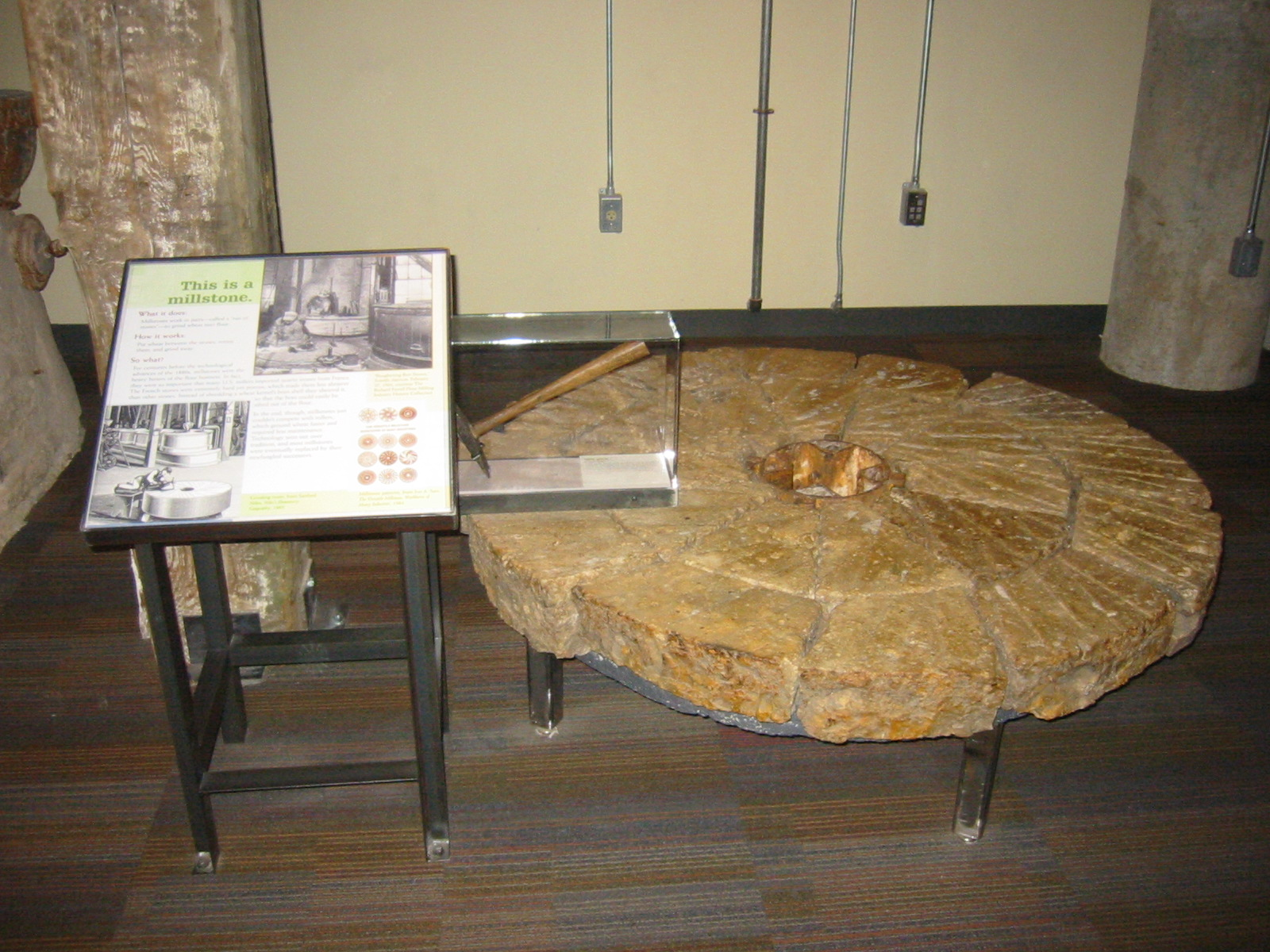
A millstone used in previous flour milling processes

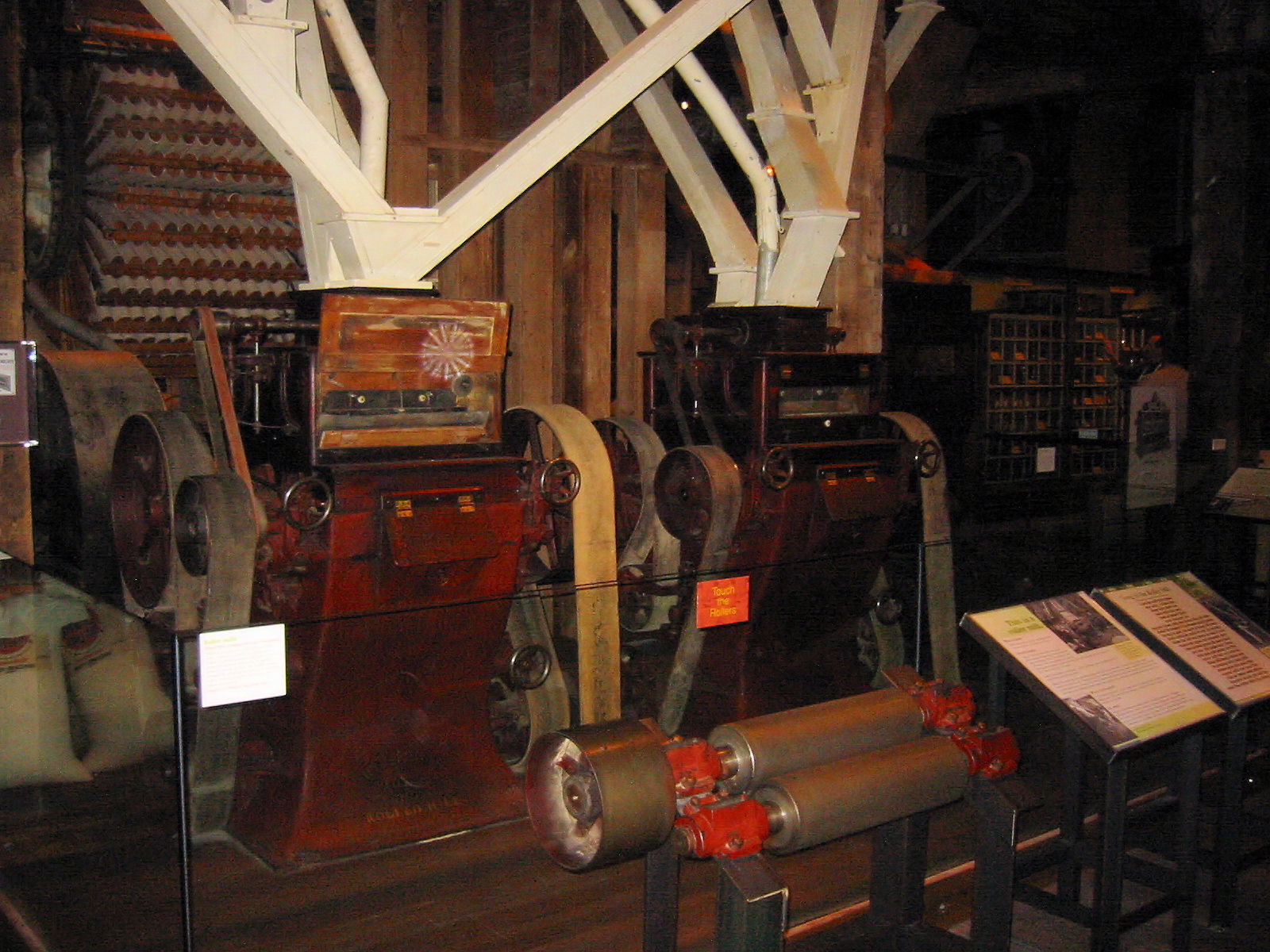
Equipment used in the roller milling process
