= West Pharmaceutical Services =

American healthcare company

West Pharmaceutical Services, Inc.
- Type: Public
- Traded as: NYSE: WST; S&P 500 component
- Industry: Medical devices Pharmaceuticals
- Founded: 1923
- Headquarters: Exton, Pennsylvania, U.S.
- Key people: Michel Lagarde (president and CEO) Silji Abraham (CDO since 2018) Bernard J. Birkett (CFO since 2018) Annette F. Favorite (CHRO since 2015) Quintin J. Lai (Corporate Development, Strategy and Investor Relations since 2016) George L. Miller (GC and CS since 2015) David A. Montecalvo (COO and SCO since 2019) Eric Resnick (CTO since 2016)
- Revenue: US$1,849.9 million (2019)
- Operating income: US$296.6 million (2019)
- Net income: US$241.7 million (2019)
- Number of employees: 8,200 (2019)
- Website: westpharma.com

West Pharmaceutical Services, Inc. is a designer and manufacturer of injectable pharmaceutical packaging and delivery systems. Founded in 1923 by Herman O. West and J.R. Wike of Philadelphia, the company is headquartered in Exton, Pennsylvania. In its early years of development, West produced rubber components for packaging injectable drugs, providing a sterile environment for the producers of penicillin and insulin.

== Overview ==
West manufactures components and systems for injectable drug delivery and plastic packaging, and delivery system components for the healthcare and consumer products markets. In 2019, the company reported US$1,849.9 million in sales.

Michel Lagarde became president and chief executive officer on August 31, 2026, succeeding Eric Green; Robert Friel became board chair on the same date.

On January 29, 2003, an accumulation of combustible polyethelene powder caused an explosion at a West rubber-manufacturing plant in Kinston, North Carolina.

In 2005, West acquired The Tech Group, Scottsdale, Ariz., and Medimop Medical Projects Ltd., Ra’anana, Israel.
