= Great Mill Disaster =

Flour dust explosion in a Minneapolis mill in 1878

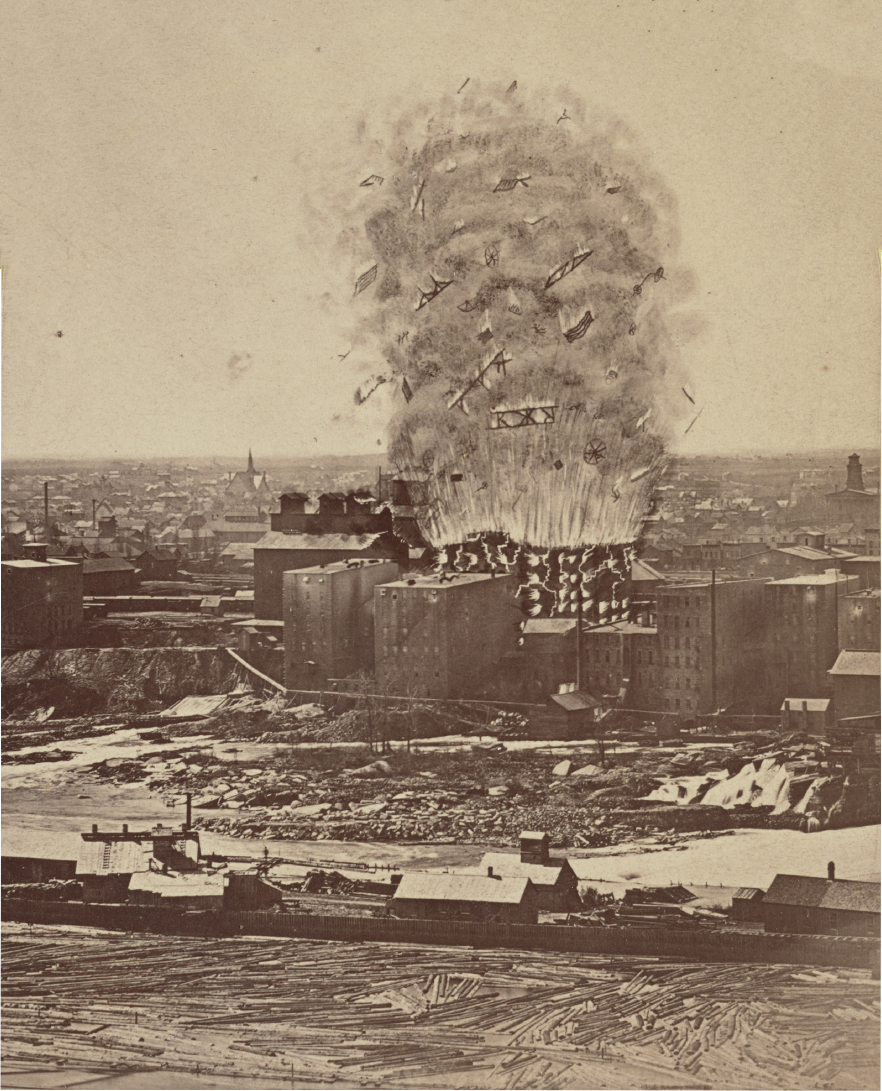
- Illustration of the Great Mill Disaster
- Date: May 2, 1878
- Time: 7:00 p.m./19:00
- Location: Minneapolis, Minnesota, United States; 44°58′45″N 93°15′24″W
- Type: Dust explosion, industrial disaster
- Deaths: 18

The Great Mill Disaster, also known as the Washburn A Mill explosion, occurred on May 2, 1878, in Minneapolis, Minnesota, United States. The disaster resulted in 18 deaths. The explosion occurred on a Thursday evening when an accumulation of flour dust inside the Washburn A Mill, the largest mill in the world at the time, led to a dust explosion that killed the fourteen workers inside the mill. The resulting fire destroyed several nearby mills and killed a further four millworkers. The destruction seriously impacted the city's productive capacity for flour, which was a major industry in the city. Following the blast, Cadwallader C. Washburn, the mill's owner, had a new mill, designed by William de la Barre, constructed on the site of the old one. This building was also later destroyed, and today the building's ruins are a National Historic Landmark and operated as part of the Mill City Museum.

== Background ==
In 1874, businessman Cadwallader C. Washburn of La Crosse, Wisconsin, opened the Washburn A Mill in Minneapolis. At the time of its opening, it was the largest industrial building in the city and the largest flour mill in the world. With about 200 employees in 1878, it was also one of the city's largest employers. The mill was located adjacent to several other flour mills along the Mississippi River near the Saint Anthony Falls, where it derived its power from a canal that flowed through the building's lower level. At this time, Minneapolis was a hub of flour production in the United States, having recently surpassed other cities such as St. Louis and Buffalo, New York, in terms of flour productive capacity, with the city popularly referred to as Flour City.

== Explosion ==
At about 6 p.m. on May 2, 1878, the mill's large day shift staff had completed their work for the day and the fourteen-man night shift staff had arrived. At around 7 p.m., three large explosions occurred within several seconds of each other inside the mill, killing the fourteen employees inside. The explosions launched debris several hundred feet into the air, with some large granite debris found eight city blocks from the mill. The sound of the explosion was heard as far away as Saint Paul, a distance of 10 miles (16 kilometers) from the mill, while some people in Minneapolis who had felt the blast thought that it had been an earthquake. The explosion spawned a massive fire that spread to two adjacent mills, the Diamond and Humboldt mills, causing both of them to also explode and killing another four millworkers including mill owner Jack Reisman. The intensity of the heat from the blaze hindered firefighting activities, as firefighters could not get close to the buildings, and as a result they continued to fight the fire through the night. The following day, the Minneapolis Tribune reported on the disaster, saying, "Minneapolis has met with a calamity, the suddenness and horror of which it is difficult for the mind to comprehend". In total, six mills were destroyed.

== Aftermath ==
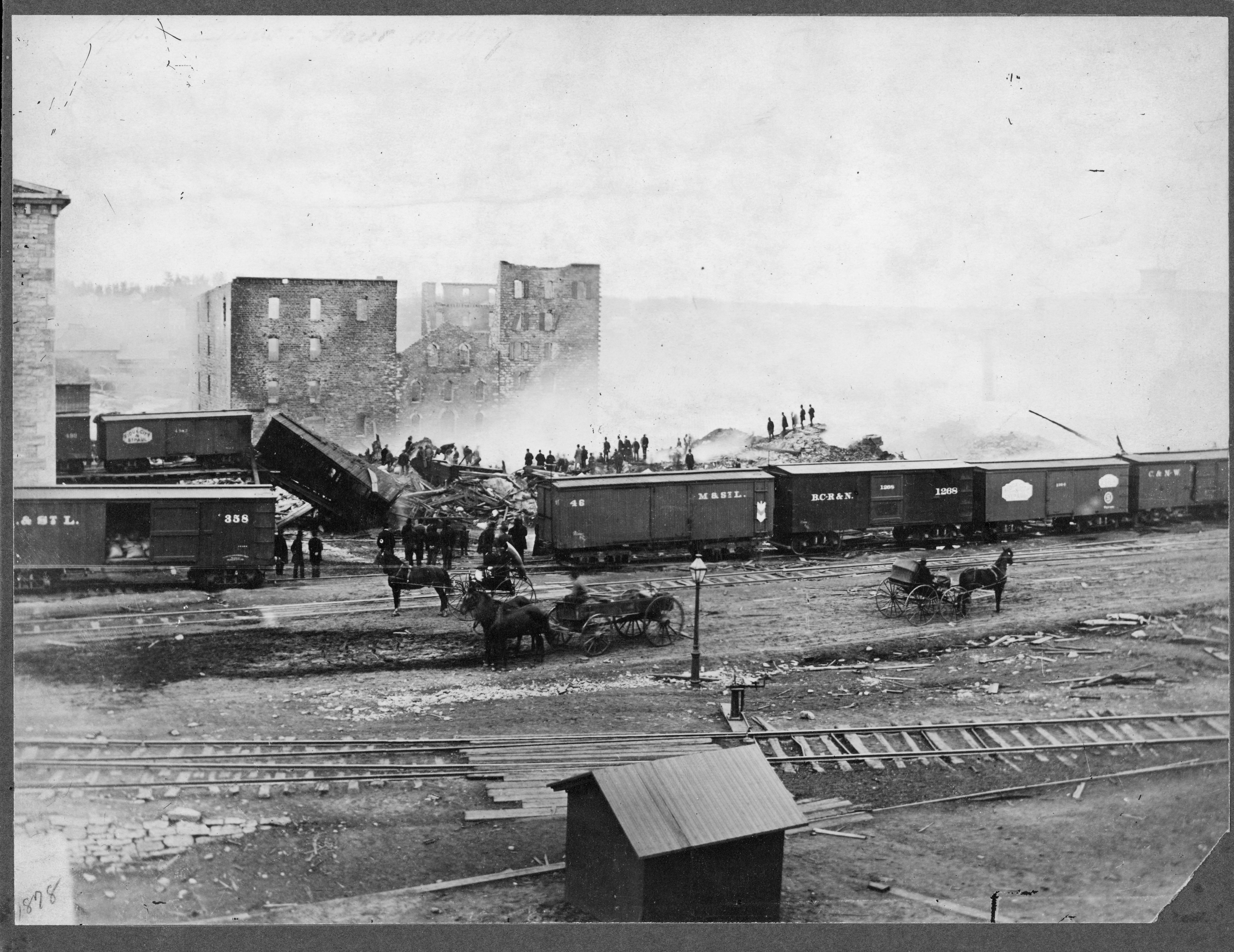
View two days after the explosion

As part of an investigation into the cause of the disaster, mill manager John A. Christian stated that it had been a dust explosion caused by flour dust in the building. Two professors from the University of Minnesota, S. F. Peckham and Louis W. Peck, later confirmed that abundant flour dust had been the cause of the explosion after reviewing controlled experiments regarding flour dust combustion. They concluded that two dry millstones had rubbed against each other and caused a spark that ignited the dust, causing the explosion.

"This mill was erected in the year 1879, on the site of Washburn Mill "A," which was totally destroyed on the second day of May, 1878, by fire and a terrific explosion occasioned by the rapid combustion of flour dust. Not one stone was left upon another, and every person engaged in the mill instantly lost his life."

— Inscription on a memorial marker erected at the new mill.

Following the event, there were concerns about the effect it would have on the city's milling industry, as the disaster had destroyed roughly one-third to one-half of the city's flour productive capacity. (Note: Sources disagree on the economic impact of the disaster, with the reduction in productive capacity being given as either one-third or one-half.) Shortly after the explosion, Washburn, who had traveled to Minneapolis upon hearing of the incident, announced his intention to rebuild the mill, with technological improvements that would make it safer and increase its productive capacity. Washburn hired Austrian engineer William de la Barre to design the new building, which he based on a mill in Budapest. De la Barre also installed dust collectors and improved ventilation systems.

This new building was completed in 1880 on the site of the former building. The reopening coincided with an economic boom for the city, and flour production steadily increased until it peaked during World War I, after which there was a steady industry decline. The new mill (later known as the Gold Medal Flour mill) was affected by a fire in 1928, but following repairs it continued to operate until 1965. The building was later abandoned and finally destroyed in a fire in 1991. In 2003, the building's ruins were converted into the Mill City Museum, a history museum that focuses on the milling history of the city. Today, the ruins are listed on the National Register of Historic Places as a National Historic Landmark.

The MNopedia entry for the disaster states, "It was the worst disaster of its type in the city's history, prompting major safety upgrades in future mill developments". According to General Mills (the eventual successor company of the mill), the disaster prompted Washburn to take an interest in the welfare of the children of the millworkers who had been affected, leading to the creation of the Washburn Memorial Orphan Asylum. Its successor organization, the Washburn Center for Children, continues to operate as a child and family services organization in the Twin Cities area.

== Memorials ==
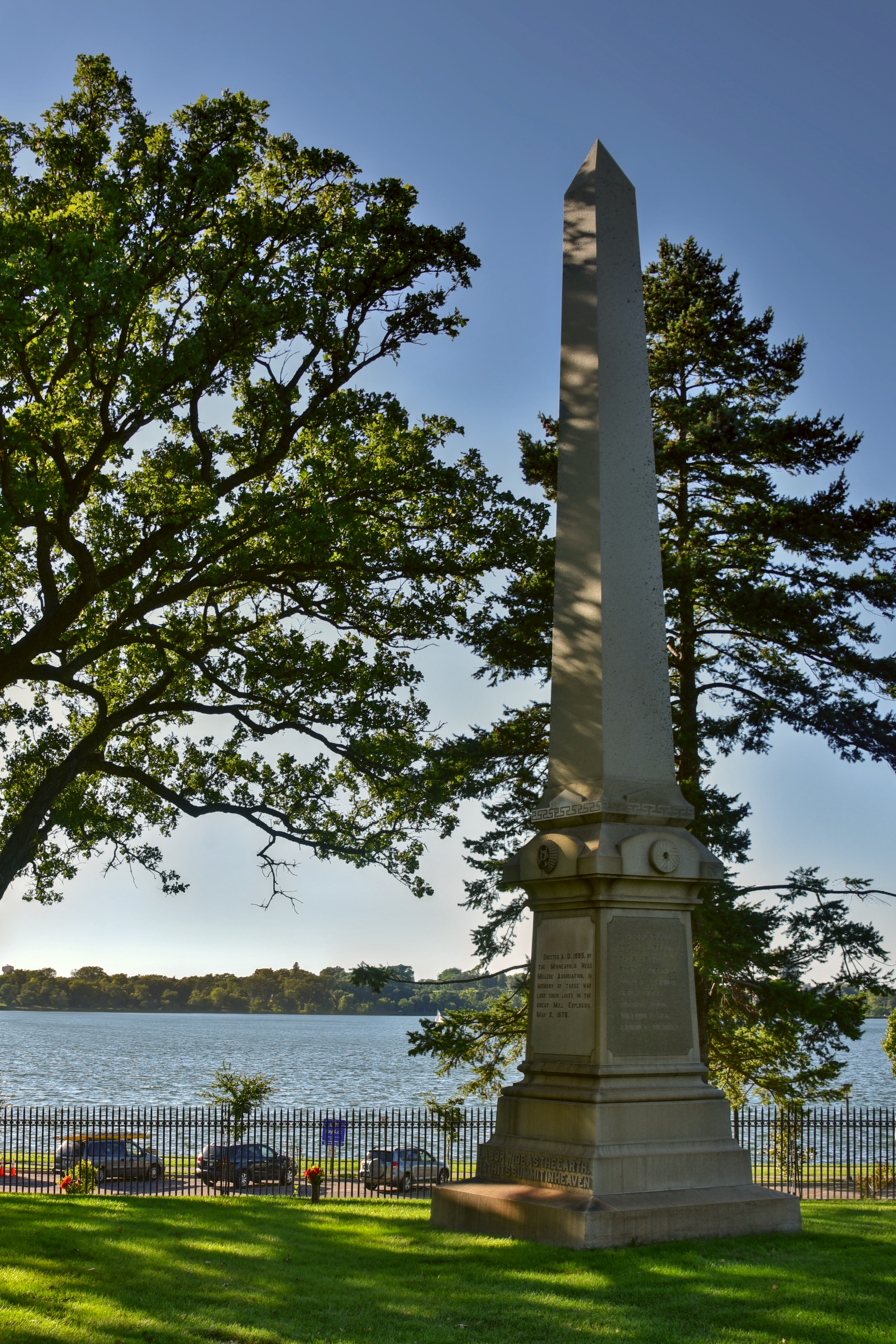
Memorial in Lakewood Cemetery

On the site of the destroyed mill, a stone memorial marker that lists the names of the 14 workers who died at the previous factory was erected as part of a stone portal. The memorial also includes a brief history of the disaster. Today, it is located near the Stone Arch Bridge. In the city's Lakewood Cemetery, a memorial dedicated to the 18 people who died in the disaster was erected in 1885. The memorial includes a plaque that lists the names of the deceased, while the base of the memorial depicts a sheaf of wheat, a broken gear, and a millstone.

== See also ==
- Tradeston Flour Mills explosion – A similar dust explosion at a flour mill in Glasgow in 1872
- List of industrial disasters
- List of industrial disasters by death toll
