= Port Colborne explosion =

Major dust explosion that occurred in Ontario, Canada

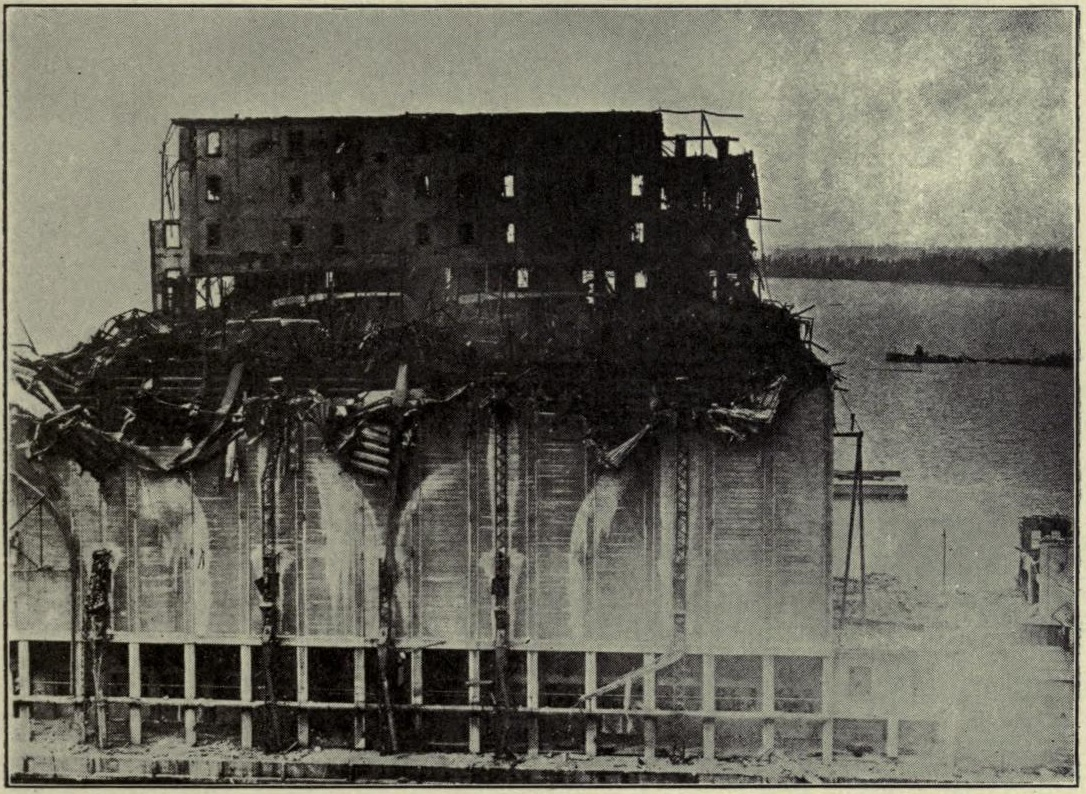
- Grain Elevator after a Dust Explosion at Port Colborne, Ontario
- Date: August 9, 1919
- Time: 1:15 p.m./13:15, Eastern Standard Time
- Location: Port Colborne, Ontario, Canada; 42°52′25″N 79°15′10″W
- Deaths: 10
- Injuries: 16

The Port Colborne explosion at Port Colborne, Ontario was a dust explosion in the Dominion grain elevator on August 9, 1919. The blast killed 10 and seriously injured 16 more.

== Background ==
A dust explosion is the rapid combustion of fine particles suspended in the air within an enclosed location. Dust explosions can occur where any dispersed powdered combustible material is present in high-enough concentrations in the atmosphere or other oxidizing gaseous medium, such as pure oxygen. Dust explosions are a frequent hazard in coal mines, grain elevators, and other industrial environments. The Port Colborne explosion was just one of five that occurred in North America between May 20 to September 13, 1919, due to a lack of regulations concerning grain shipment. The series of dust explosions resulted in 70 deaths and many more injuries.

== Explosion ==
Servicing the grain exports of Canada the concrete structure that had a capacity of 2,250,000 US bushels (79,000 m^{3}) was completely destroyed as well as the steamer Quebec which was berthed next to the elevator. The explosion sent flames hundreds of feet in the air and debris was blown 1.5 miles (2.4 km) away.

== See also ==
Event	Date	Location	Country	Source material	Fatalities	Injuries	Notes
Milwaukee Works explosion	May 20, 1919	Milwaukee, Wisconsin	United States	Feed grinding plant	3	4	The blast was felt for miles around and completely leveled the plant owned by the company.
Douglas Starch Works explosion	May 22, 1919	Cedar Rapids, Iowa	United States	corn starch	43	30	The blast was felt for miles around and completely leveled the plant owned by the company.
Port Colborne explosion	August 9, 1919	Port Colborne, Ontario	Canada	grain	10	16	Blast also destroyed the steamer Quebec which was near the grain elevator
Large terminal grain elevator in Kansas City	September 13, 1919	Kansas City, Missouri	United States		14	10	Originated in basement of elevator, during a cleanup period, and travelled up through the elevator shaft
