= 2008 Georgia Imperial Sugar refinery explosion =

Fatal industrial disaster

Coordinates: 32.144°N 81.144°W

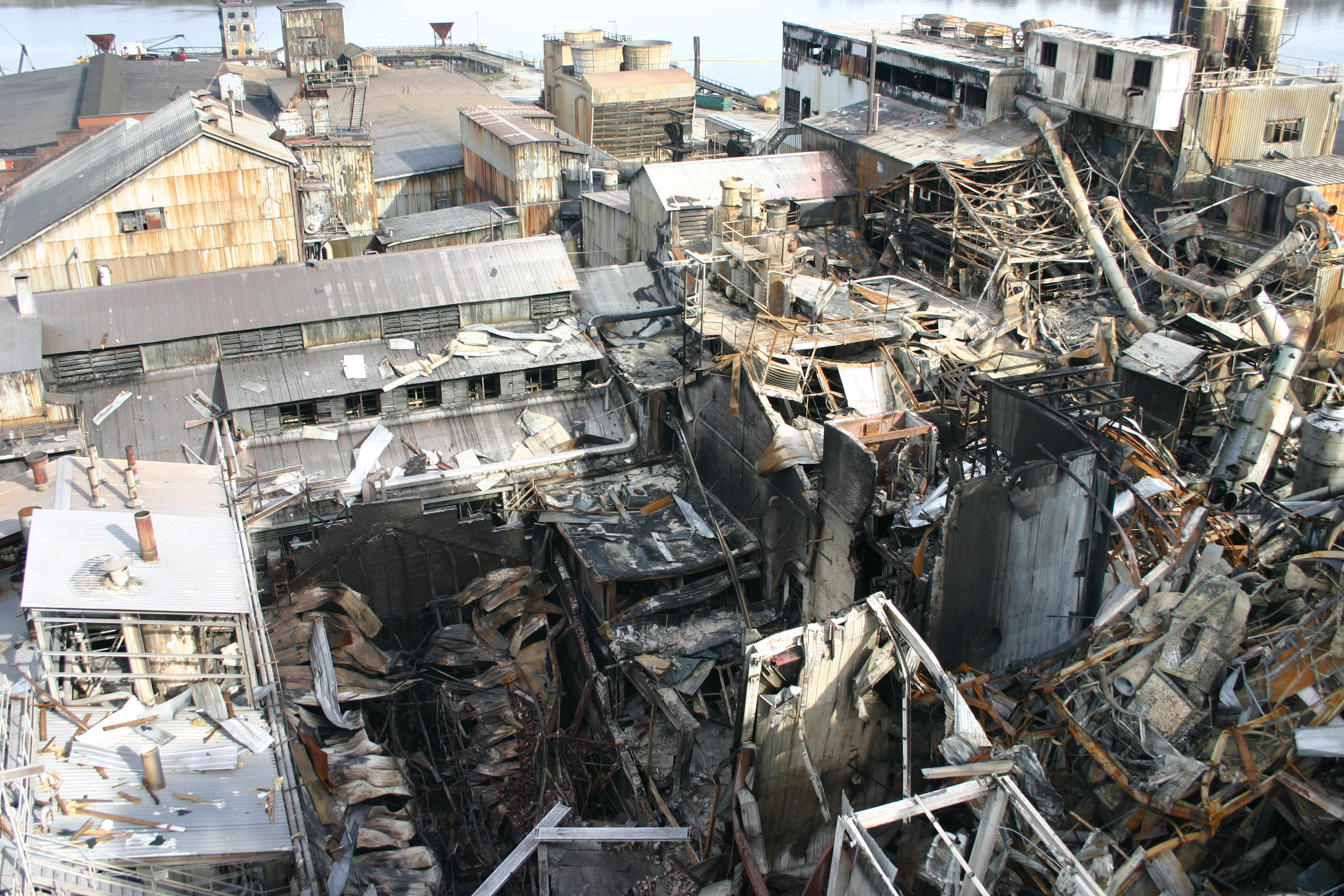
- Aerial view of the damage to the refinery.
- Date: February 7, 2008
- Time: 7:00 p.m., Eastern Standard Time
- Location: Port Wentworth, Georgia, U.S.
- Deaths: 14
- Injuries: 36

On 7 February 2008, fourteen people were killed and thirty-six injured during a dust explosion at a refinery owned by Imperial Sugar in Port Wentworth, Georgia, United States. Dust explosions had been an issue of concern among U.S. authorities since three fatal accidents in 2003, with efforts made to improve safety and reduce the risk of reoccurrence.

The Port Wentworth refinery was large and old, featuring outdated construction methods, factors which are believed to have contributed to the fire's severity. The origin of the explosion was narrowed down to the center of the factory, in a basement located beneath storage silos. Large accumulations of sugar dust due to poor housekeeping became airborne from the initial shock waves, leading to a series of massive secondary explosions spreading throughout the factory. Investigations conducted by the Department of Justice ruled out deliberate criminal activity in 2013.

As a result of the industrial disaster, new safety legislation was proposed. Port Wentworth's economy declined because the factory had ceased operating. Imperial intended to rebuild it and return to production by the end of 2008, with replacement buildings to be completed by summer the following year. Victims filed up to 44 lawsuits for damages against Imperial and/or the company hired to clean up the site. Imperial said that the explosion was the main reason for a major loss in the first quarter of 2008.

The U.S. Chemical Safety Board (CSB) released its report on the incident in September 2009, saying that the explosion had been "entirely preventable". Investigations by Occupational Safety and Health Administration (OSHA) and the Bureau of Alcohol, Tobacco, Firearms and Explosives (ATF) reached similar conclusions.

== Background ==
Imperial Sugar's refinery in Port Wentworth, Georgia, was a four-story structure on the bank of the Savannah River. Imperial, based in Sugar Land, Texas, had bought the refinery and its brand name in 1997 from a previous local owner. Known since construction as the Dixie Crystal refinery, it was the main employer in Port Wentworth, a town of 3,500, prior to the disaster.

The Port Wentworth refinery was constructed in 1916 by 400 people who were moved from Louisiana specifically for this purpose, and opened the following year. Imperial bought the refinery together with Savannah Foods to form part of a national supply and distribution network to meet demand from businesses such as Piggly Wiggly, General Mills and Wal-Mart. This network was the second largest in the United States.

The refinery sat on a 160 acres (0.65 km^{2}; 0.25 sq mi) site and was spread across 872,000 square feet (81,000 m^{2}). Workers described the factory as antiquated, with much of the machinery dating back more than twenty-eight years. The site had continued operating because it had good access to rail and shipping links for transport.

In the last full fiscal year before the disaster, which ended on September 30, 2007, the facility refined 14.51 million hundredweight (658,163 tonnes) of sugar, 9% of the nation's requirements, compared to Imperial's Gramercy, Louisiana, refinery, which refined 11.08 million hundredweight (502,580 tonnes) of sugar in the same time period. 90% of the raw sugar supplied to the facility came from overseas in that year, and Imperial expected the "vast majority" to come in from abroad in the year of the explosion as well.

In the time leading up to the explosion, Imperial had run into financial difficulties. In the fiscal year ending September 30, 2007, sales had fallen eight percent while the company's profits and stock price had fallen by half. The last two annual reports by Imperial before the explosion said that any damage to the facility at Port Wentworth would "have a material effect on the company's business, financial condition, results of operations and cash flows".

Meanwhile, in 2004 the CSB conducted a study into the risks presented by dust explosions after three fatal accidents in the year before. The West Pharmaceutical Services explosion in North Carolina killed six persons, the CTA Acoustics explosion in Kentucky killed seven, and the Hayes Lemmerz explosion in Indiana killed one, prompting the report. The CSB found that between 1980 and 2005, there had been 281 explosions involving combustible dust, resulting in 119 deaths and 718 injuries. The agency made a number of recommendations to the Occupational Safety and Health Administration (OSHA), which had been partly implemented by 2008. The CSB continued to be concerned about the potential for further fatal accidents up until the explosion at the Imperial refinery in Port Wentworth.

== Explosion and emergency response ==
The explosion occurred at 7 p.m. local time in what was initially believed to be a room where sugar was bagged by workers. Witnesses from across the Savannah River in South Carolina reported seeing flames shoot up several stories high. There were 112 employees on-site at the time. The explosion occurred in the center of the refinery, where bagging and storage facilities were fed sugar by a network of elevators and conveyor belts. Many of the buildings at this location were six to eight stories high with narrow gaps in between.

Ambulances responded to the scene from across twelve counties, and firefighters from three. The United States Coast Guard closed off the river in the area, and a firefighting tugboat was used to douse the fire from the river. A helicopter was used to search the river for anyone who may have been thrown into it by the blast. Off-duty employees were brought in to assist with search and rescue operations, as emergency services personnel were unfamiliar with the plant's layout. Red Cross worker Joyce Baker, who was among the first to arrive at the scene, reported that it was like "walking into hell", with some of the men she treated having "no skin at all", while others had skin "just dripping off them".

The Georgia Emergency Management Agency (GEMHSA) alerted local hospitals to prepare for up to 100 casualties. A doctor at nearby Memorial Health Hospital described patients arriving at an emergency triage as varying in condition from suffering minor burns to their hands to having received 80-90 percent burns, with many in critical condition, and one with 95 percent burns. The victims' ages ranged from 18 to 50. Many victims were placed in artificial comas because they were on life support systems. Eight were transported by helicopter to the specialized Joseph M. Still Burn Center in Augusta, about an hour away. Five of those injured later died there while receiving treatment.

A church close to the refinery was used as a point for families seeking information on relatives employed at the facility. So many people came that police requested that each family send only one representative. At the close of the day of the explosion, six people were missing, with no confirmed deaths. Overnight, several deep-seated fires were uncovered, and firefighting continued the next day.

Most of the three-mile (5 km) stretch of river that had previously been closed was reopened without restriction, although a patrol remained in place to enforce a safety zone. The river restrictions delayed one outgoing vessel and two incoming ones. There was also a minor oil spill originating from equipment at the refinery's unoccupied and rarely used dock.

The explosion seriously weakened the structure of the refinery, leaving it highly unstable. There was also extensive smoke damage. The packaging area was totally destroyed; twelve percent of the refinery was demolished by the explosion. Removal of debris began the day after the accident, with assistance from structural engineers. The six missing persons were all found dead that day, three of them in tunnels running beneath the facility. The final death toll was thirteen. It was the first major shutdown of a U.S. sugar refinery since American Sugar Refining Inc.'s Domino Sugar shut down its plant in Chalmette, Louisiana, in the aftermath of Hurricane Katrina.

After seven days, on February 14, 2008, the worst of the fire had been extinguished. The 100-foot (30 m) sugar storage silos remained alight despite attempts to put the fire out by dousing them with thousands of gallons of water from a helicopter. Specialist crews and equipment were called in to complete work tackling the smoldering, molten sugar in the silos. At this time, seven bodies had been recovered, and an eighth person had died in the hospital.

== Investigation ==
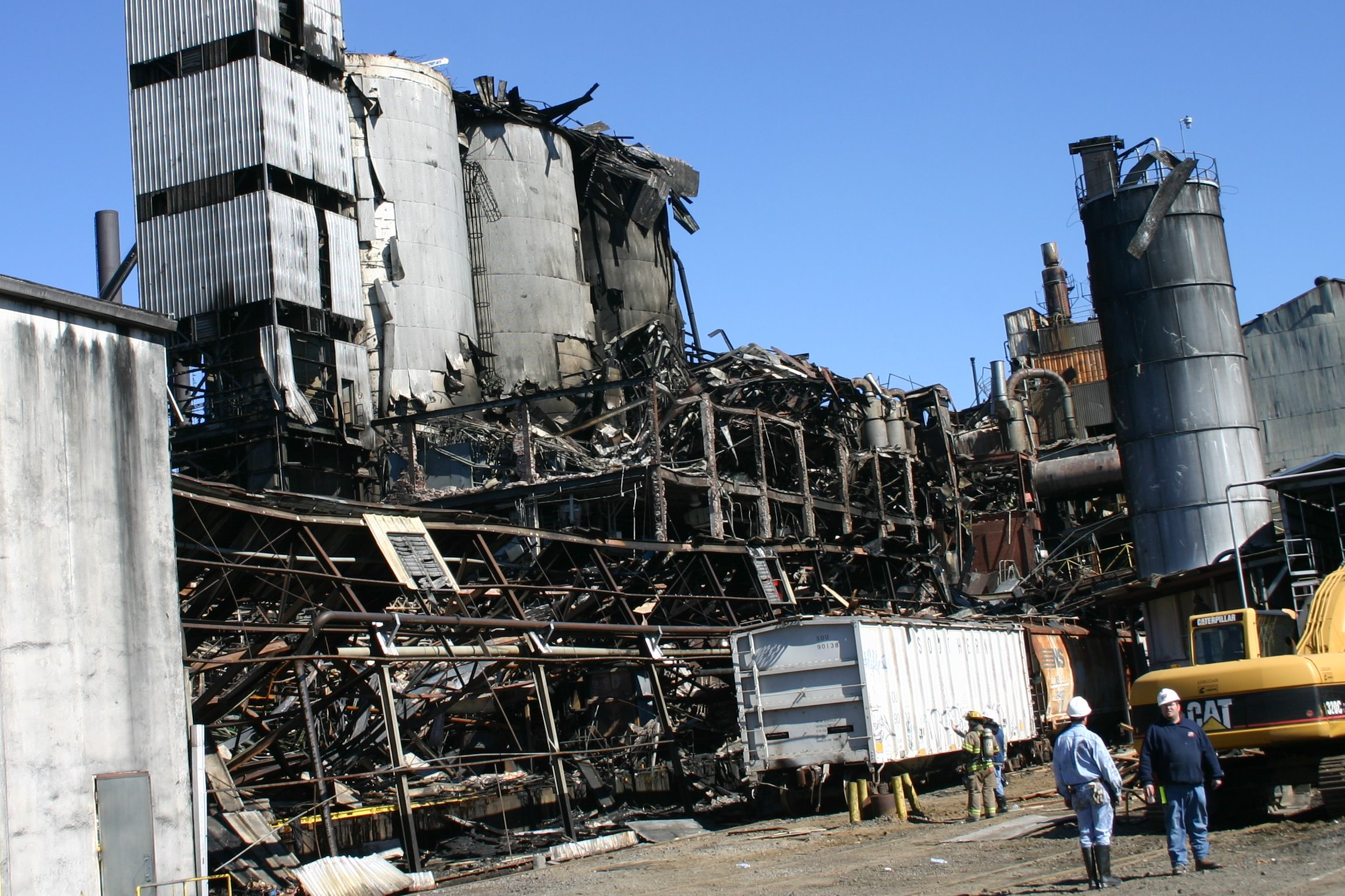
The explosion was determined to have occurred in this building and two of the three silos visible behind it.

The location of the explosion was quickly established as a building used to store refined sugar before packaging it and two of three 100-foot (30 m) tall, 18-inch (46 cm) thick reinforced concrete storage silos adjacent to it, as pictured. According to Imperial Sugar CEO John Sheptor, the accumulated sugar dust likely acted like gunpowder. Sheptor, who was in the plant at the time of the explosion, survived only because he was protected by a firewall. Heavy equipment had to be used to shore up the partially collapsed structure before firefighters could enter it to search for victims. Within twenty-four hours, the explosive substance was identified as sugar dust.

Federal investigations by OSHA and the CSB were launched, and they interviewed witnesses, checked documentation, and conducted on-scene examination of the plant. OSHA arrived within two hours and the CSB within forty-eight hours. Other brief investigations were conducted by state firefighters and police and the Bureau of Alcohol, Tobacco, Firearms, and Explosives (ATF), but these were ended quickly after confirming there was no evidence of the explosion and fire having been deliberately started. In a press conference held on February 17, 2008, one of the six members of the CSB team said that the explosion showed the ongoing risk from dust explosions despite their report highlighting the matter in 2004.

Investigators were unable to enter the silos as OSHA ruled them to be too hazardous after the explosion. They were only able to access the area after the silos were demolished. By the time this took place, four months after the disaster, investigators believed that the explosion started in a basement area beneath the silos, from which sugar was fed up to the packaging building on conveyor belts. The factory's outdated construction materials and methods are believed to have contributed to the severity of the blaze. The ceiling was of wooden tongue and groove design. The creosote used throughout was known as “fat lighter,” because of the fire risk it posed. Interviews of Imperial employees conducted by OSHA uncovered a lack of training, as forty of the workers reported never receiving training on how to exit the building in an emergency. Only five employees recalled having a fire drill.

== Aftermath ==
=== Initial response ===
Imperial's refinery in Louisiana was shut down by the company six weeks after the Port Wentworth disaster, over fears a similar explosion would occur there. It was kept from operating for more than a week. OSHA fined Imperial $36,000 over safety legislation violations at that plant.

The Georgia plant's 371 workers continued to receive payment from Imperial, and 275 were rehired to assist with cleanup and demolition of parts of the refinery that could not be salvaged. Work began on April 18, 2008, after Imperial's board confirmed their intention to rebuild. The plan was for the plant to return to sugar refining by the end of 2008. Demolition of the sugar silos was conducted on June 24, 2008, with a wrecking ball. A replacement packaging building and new sugar silos were intended to be completed by summer 2009. During demolition, 2,800,000 pounds (1,300,000 kg) of fire-hardened sugar were recovered from one silo, and another 500,000 pounds (230,000 kg) from the second silo. The company hoped to recycle the product for ethanol production. In the first quarter of 2008, Imperial posted a $15.5 million loss, which they said was primarily due to the explosion. Port Wentworth suffered an economic depression after the accident, with local businesses losing many customers. Imperial was purchased in 2012 by the Louis Dreyfus Group.

=== Reports from OSHA and CSB ===
Within a month of the accident, OSHA, fearing that many employers may be unaware their facilities presented a risk of dust explosions, sent a letter to 30,000 employees to alert them to the danger of a similar explosion occurring. OSHA also proposed the Combustible Dust Explosion and Fire Prevention Act of 2008, a new bill aimed at introducing regulations to reduce the risk of dust explosions. The bill passed the United States House of Representatives but never passed the United States Senate. In 2009 OSHA began developing a federal standard for combustible dust. Congress introduced a bill in 2013 to require OSHA to issue an interim standard based on the voluntary combustible standard set by National Fire Protection Association.

The CSB released its report in September 2009, saying the explosion had been "entirely preventable". It noted that the sugar industry had been aware of the risk of dust explosions since 1926. Specifically, internal company memorandums by managers in 1967 expressed their concern about the potential of explosions from sugar dust. Imperial Sugar had made construction changes before the explosion, that enabled the accumulation of sugar dust. It had never practiced evacuation procedures, and the lack of emergency lighting meant that people were confined to dark hallways and tunnels at the time of the explosions.

=== Legal issues ===
Victims of the disaster continued to file claims against Imperial Sugar and its construction contractor. By September 2010, 44 civil suits had been filed in Chatham County Court in relation to the explosion, and eighteen had been settled. The state appeals court rejected an effort by defendants' attorneys for a pre-trial appeal in two related cases in an effort to limit damages. In 2011 Lawrence Manker Jr., an Imperial worker who underwent 70 surgeries for burns covering 85% of his body after the plant explosion, settled his lawsuit with the company for an undisclosed amount. He was the last victim to leave a hospital burn unit.

In March 2008, Raquel Islas, a female worker whose arms were burnt, sued Savannah-based company Stokes Contracting, which was a contracted construction company. In April 2008, the widow of Shelathia Harvey also sued Stokes, as well as Savannah Foods, which operated the refinery along with Imperial. In August 2008, Malcolm Frazier, who suffered burns over 85% of his body, succumbed to his injuries at the Joseph M. Still Burn Center, where he had remained since the explosion.

The United States Department of Labor requested that Ed Tarver, U.S. Attorney for the Southern District of Georgia, pursue criminal prosecution against Imperial and its executives. OSHA cited Imperial with 124 safety violations, finding that the company acted with "plain indifference to, or intentional disregard for, employee safety and health". Tarver said there was not enough evidence of intentional disregard or plain indifference to bring criminal charges against Imperial. He also cited a lack of federal criminal laws specifically related to safety in the sugar industry as a reason for his decision.

OSHA fined Imperial $8.8 million in May 2010 after citing the company for 211 violations at the Port Wentworth plant and the plant in Louisiana. After settlement negotiations the company agreed to pay $6 million, while admitting no fault.

== Monument ==
On February 7, 2009, a monument honoring the people lost in the explosion was dedicated at Legacy Park, on the grounds of the Port Wentworth plant.

== See also ==
- U.S. Chemical Safety and Hazard Investigation Board
- Occupational Safety and Health Administration
- Occupational safety and health
