= Dust explosion =

Rapid combustion of fine particles suspended in the air

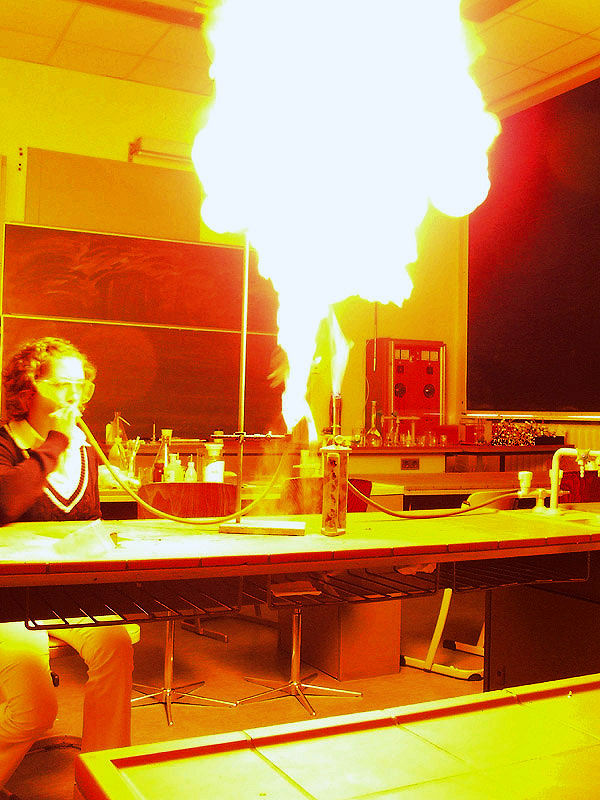
Lab demonstration with burning lycopodium powder

A dust explosion is the rapid combustion of fine particles suspended in the air within an enclosed location. Dust explosions can occur where any dispersed powdered combustible material is present in high-enough concentrations in the atmosphere or other oxidizing gaseous medium, such as pure oxygen. In cases when fuel plays the role of a combustible material, the explosion is known as a fuel-air explosion.

Dust explosions are a frequent hazard in coal mines, grain elevators and silos, and other industrial environments. They are also commonly used by special effects artists, filmmakers, and pyrotechnicians, given their spectacular appearance and ability to be safely contained under certain carefully controlled conditions.

Thermobaric weapons exploit this principle by rapidly saturating an area with an easily combustible material and then igniting it to produce explosive force. These weapons are the most powerful non-nuclear explosives in existence.

== Terminology ==
If rapid combustion occurs in a confined space, enormous overpressures can build up, causing major structural damage and flying debris. The sudden release of energy from a "detonation" can produce a shockwave, either in open air or in a confined space. If the spread of flame is at subsonic speed, the phenomenon is sometimes called a "deflagration", although looser usage calls both phenomena "explosions".

Dust explosions may be classified as being either "primary" or "secondary" in nature. Primary dust explosions may occur inside process equipment or similar enclosures, and are generally controlled by pressure relief through purpose-built ducting to the external atmosphere. Secondary dust explosions are the result of dust accumulation inside a building being disturbed and ignited by the primary explosion, resulting in a much more dangerous uncontrolled explosion that can affect the entire structure. Historically, fatalities from dust explosions have largely been the result of secondary dust explosions.

== Conditions required ==
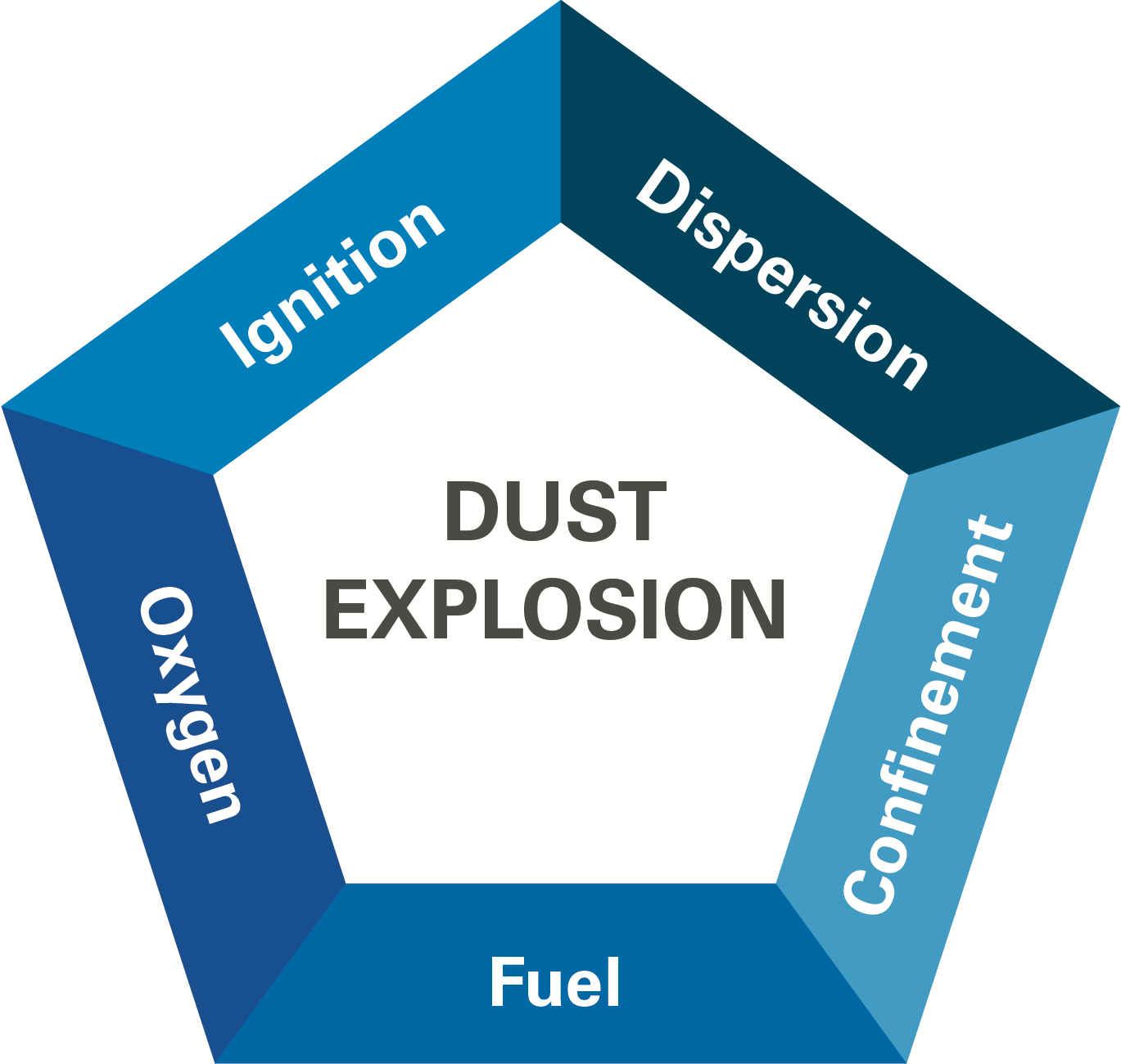
Diagram showing the five requirements for a dust explosion

There are five necessary conditions for a dust explosion:

1. A combustible dust
2. The dust is dispersed in the air within certain flammability limits
3. There is an oxidant (typically atmospheric oxygen)
4. There is an ignition source
5. The area is confined – a building can be an enclosure

=== Sources of dust ===
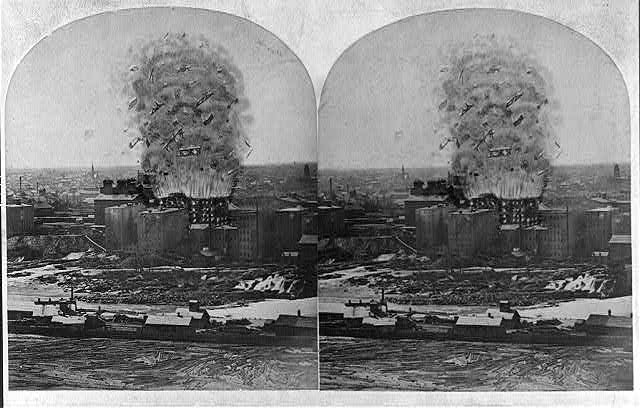
1878 stereograph rendering of the Great Mill Disaster

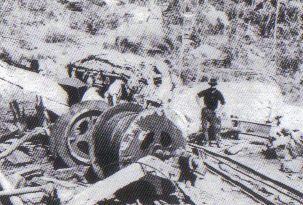
Mount Mulligan mine disaster in Australia 1921. These cable drums were blown 50 feet (15 m) from their foundations following a coal dust explosion.

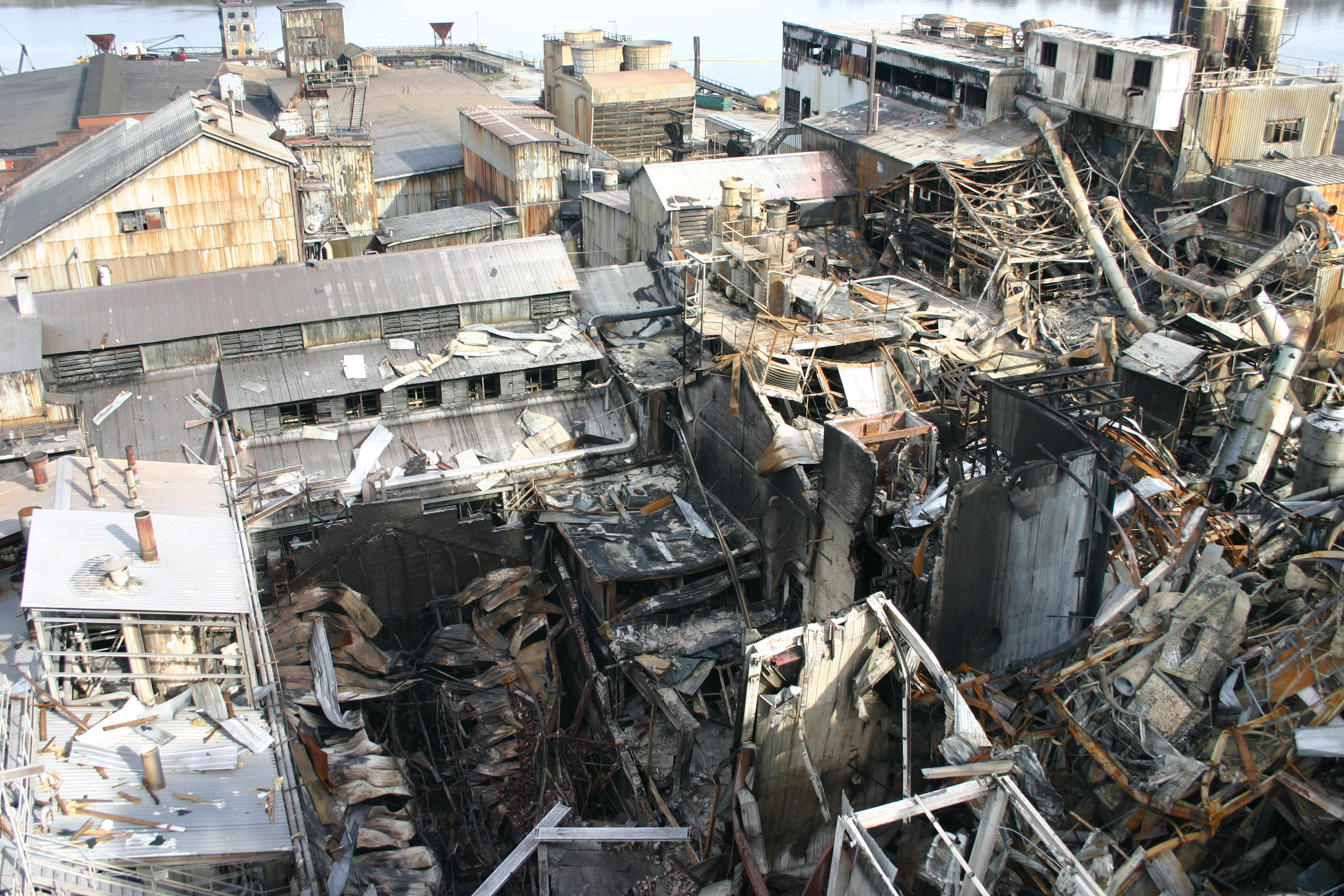
Aftermath of 2008 explosion at Imperial Sugar in Port Wentworth, Georgia, US

Many common materials which are known to burn can generate a dust explosion, such as coal dust and sawdust. In addition, many otherwise mundane organic materials can also be dispersed into a dangerous dust cloud, such as grain, flour, starch, sugar, powdered milk, cocoa, coffee, and pollen. Powdered metals (such as aluminum, magnesium, and titanium) can form explosive suspensions in air, if finely divided.

A gigantic explosion of flour dust destroyed a mill in Minnesota on May 2, 1878, killing 14 workers at the Washburn A Mill and another four in adjacent buildings. A similar problem occurs in sawmills and other places dedicated to woodworking.

Since the advent of industrial production–scale metal powder–based additive manufacturing (AM) in the 2010s, there is growing need for more information and experience with preventing dust explosions and fires from the traces of excess metal powder sometimes left over after laser sintering or other fusion methods. For example, in machining operations downstream of the AM build, excess powder liberated from porosities in the support structures can be exposed to sparks from the cutting interface. Efforts are underway not only to build this knowledgebase within the industry but also to share it with local fire departments, who do periodic fire-safety inspections of businesses in their districts and who can expect to answer alarms at shops or plants where AM is now part of the production mix.

Although not strictly a dust, paper particles emitted during processing – especially rolling, unrolling, calendaring/slitting, and sheet-cutting – are also known to pose an explosion hazard. Enclosed paper mill areas subject to such dangers commonly maintain very high air humidities to reduce the chance of airborne paper dust explosions.

In special effects pyrotechnics, lycopodium powder and non-dairy creamer are two common means of producing safe, controlled fire effects.

To support rapid combustion, the dust must consist of very small particles with a high surface area to volume ratio, thereby making the collective or combined surface area of all the particles very large in comparison to a dust of larger particles. Dust is defined as powders with particles less than about 500 micrometres in diameter, but finer dust will present a much greater hazard than coarse particles by virtue of the larger total surface area of all the particles.

=== Concentration ===
Below a certain value, the lower explosive limit (LEL), there is insufficient dust to support the combustion at the rate required for an explosion. A combustible concentration at or below 25% of the LEL is considered safe. Similarly, if the fuel to air ratio increases above the upper explosive limit (UEL), there is insufficient oxidant to permit combustion to continue at the necessary rate.

Determining the minimum explosive concentration or maximum explosive concentration of dusts in air is difficult, and consulting different sources can lead to quite different results. Typical explosive ranges in air are from few dozens grams/m^{3} for the minimum limit, to few kg/m^{3} for the maximum limit. For example, the LEL for sawdust has been determined to be between 40 and 50 grams/m^{3}. It depends on many factors including the type of material used.

=== Oxidant ===
Typically, normal atmospheric oxygen can be sufficient to support a dust explosion if the other necessary conditions are also present. High-oxygen or pure oxygen environments are considered to be especially hazardous, as are strong oxidizing gases such as chlorine and fluorine. Also, particulate suspensions of compounds with a high oxidative potential, such as peroxides, chlorates, nitrates, perchlorates, and dichromates, can increase risk of an explosion if combustible materials are also present.

=== Sources of ignition ===
There are many sources of ignition, and a naked flame need not be the only one: over one half of the dust explosions in Germany in 2005 were from non-flame sources. Common sources of ignition include:

- electrostatic discharge (e.g. an improperly installed conveyor belt, which can act like a Van de Graaff generator)
- friction
- electrical arcing from machinery or other equipment
- hot surfaces (e.g. overheated bearings)
- fire
- self-ignition

However, it is often difficult to determine the exact source of ignition when investigating after an explosion. When a source cannot be found, ignition will often be attributed to static electricity. Static charges can be generated by external sources, or can be internally generated by friction at the surfaces of particles themselves as they collide or move past one another.

== Mechanism ==
Video demonstration of a dust explosion, showing the size of an unignited dust cloud, size of the cloud ignited, a partially contained explosion, and a contained explosion

Dust has a very large surface area compared to its mass. Since burning can only occur at the surface of a solid or liquid, where it can react with oxygen, this causes dust to be much more flammable than bulk materials. For example, a 1 kg (2.2 lb) sphere of a combustible material with a density of 1 g/cm^{3} would be about 12.4 cm (4.9 in) in diameter, and have a surface area of 0.048 m^{2} (0.52 sq ft). However, if it were broken up into spherical dust particles 50 μm in diametre (about the size of flour particles) it would have a surface area of 120 m^{2} (1,300 sq ft). This greatly-increased surface area allows the material to burn much faster, and the extremely small mass of each particle allows them to catch on fire with much less energy than the bulk material, as there is no heat loss to conduction within the material.

When this mixture of fuel and air is ignited, especially in a confined space such as a warehouse or silo, a significant increase in pressure is created, often more than sufficient to demolish the structure. Even materials that are traditionally thought of as nonflammable (such as aluminium), or slow burning (such as wood), can produce a powerful explosion when finely divided, and can be ignited by even a small spark.

Demonstration of an open-air dust explosion

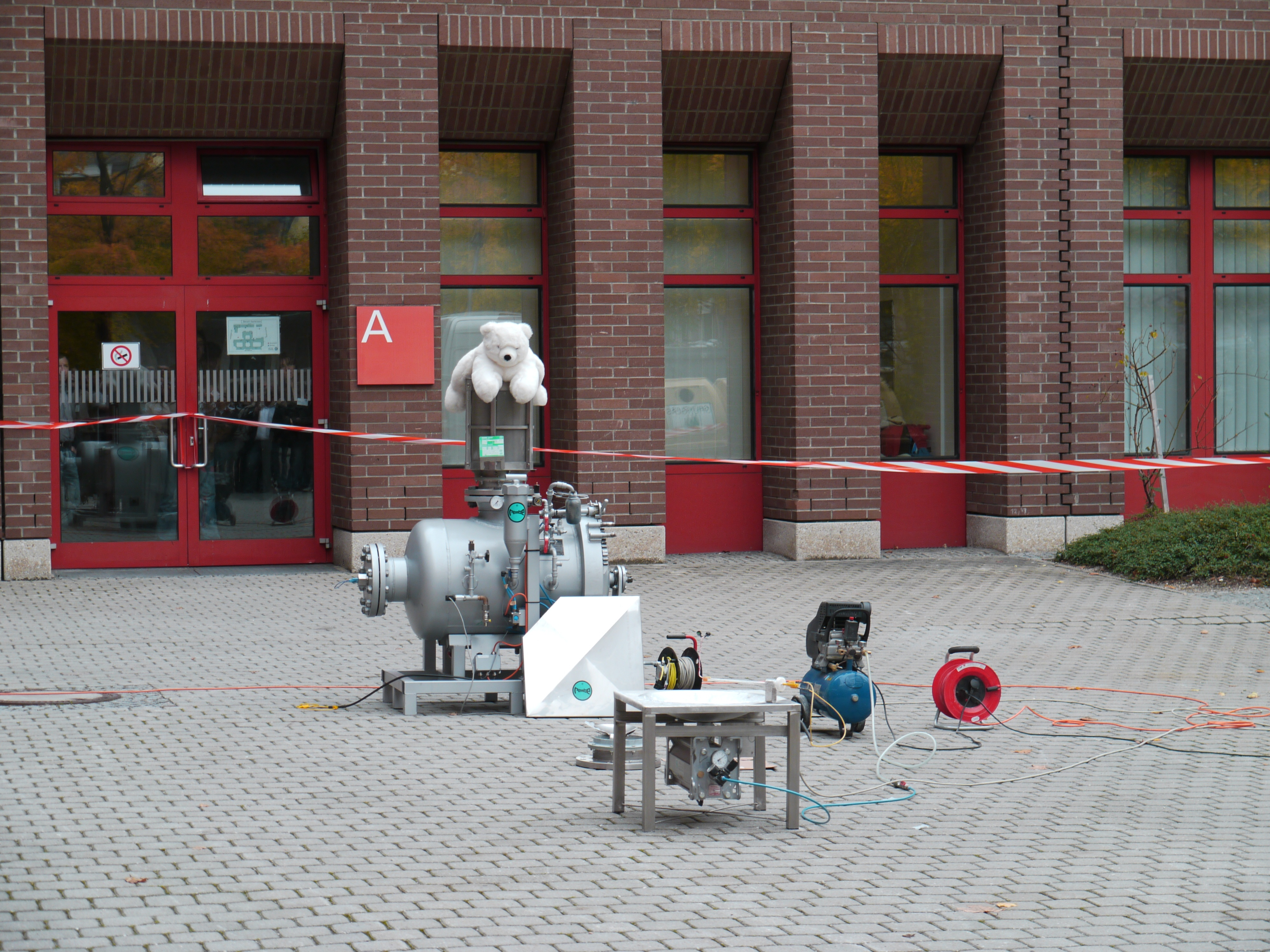
Experimental setup

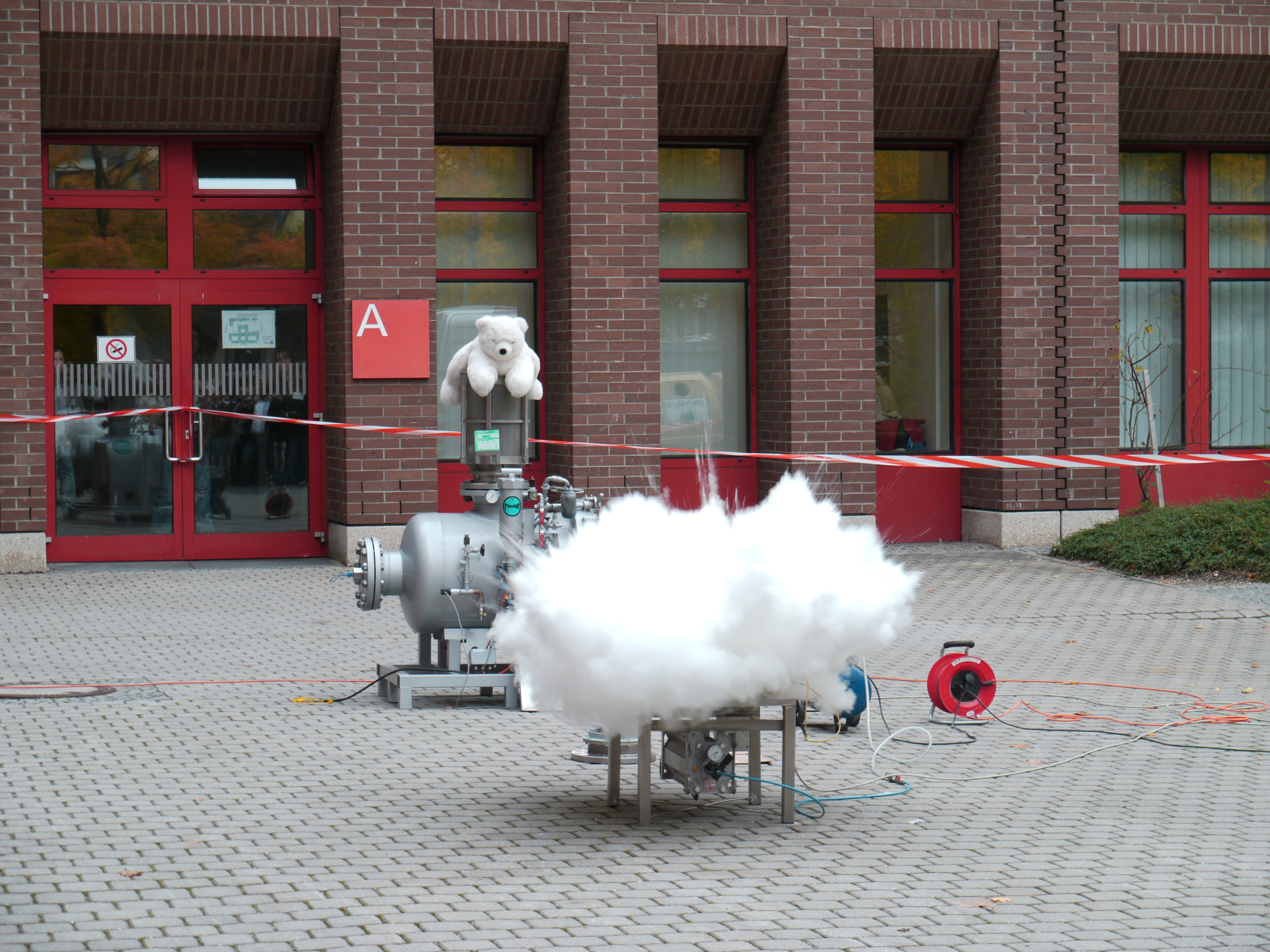
Finely-ground flour is dispersed

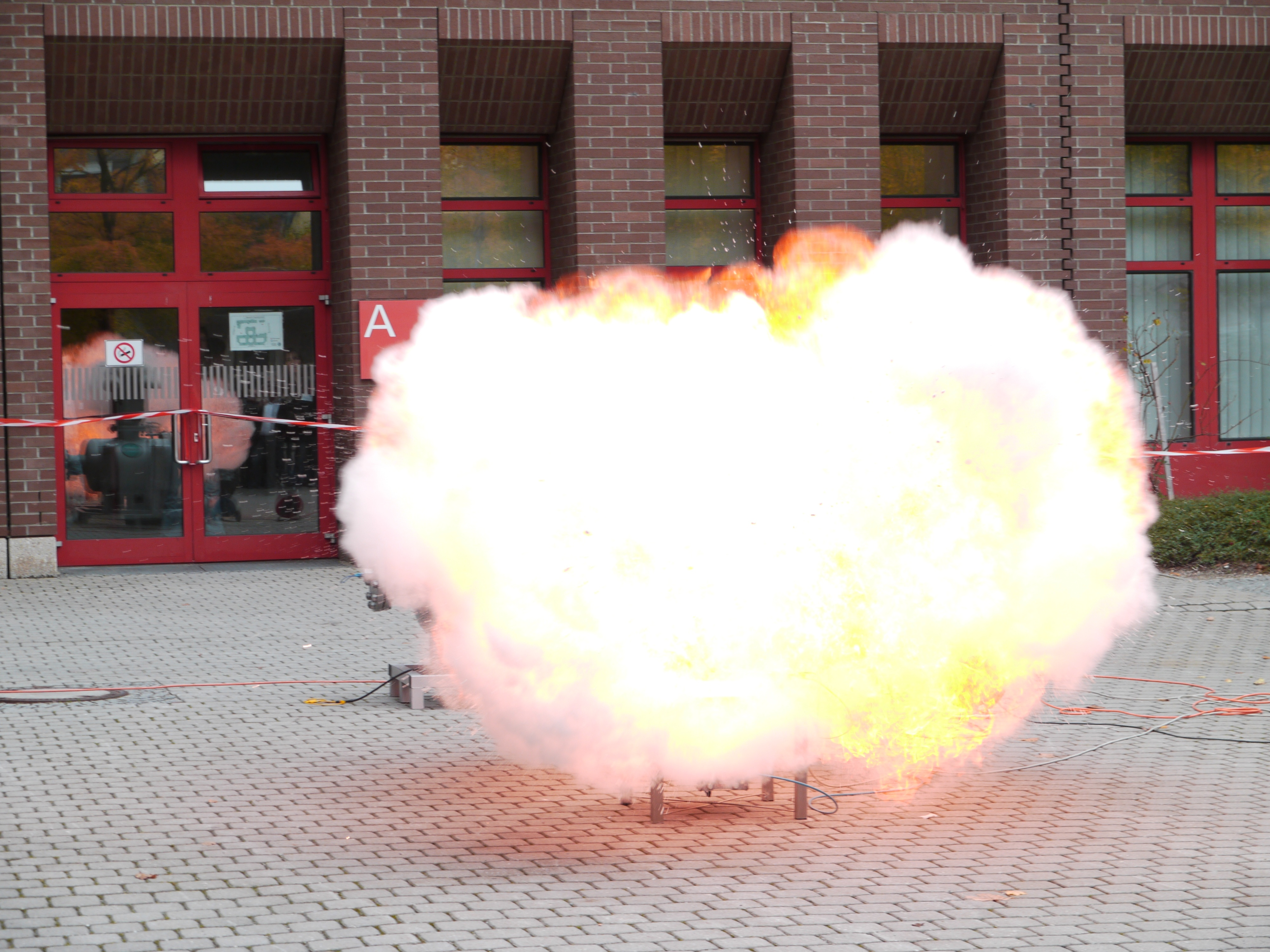
Cloud of flour is ignited

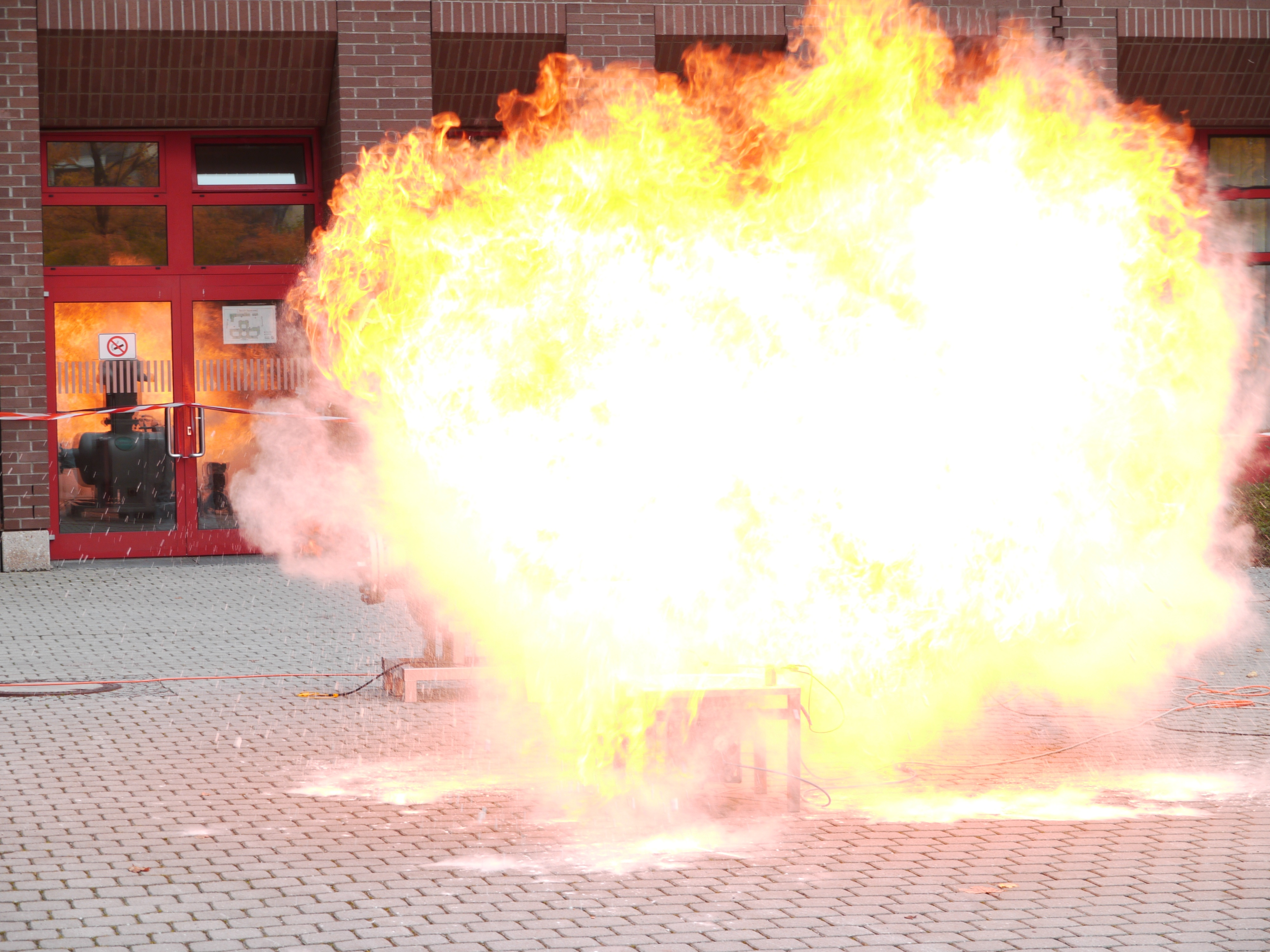
Fireball spreads rapidly

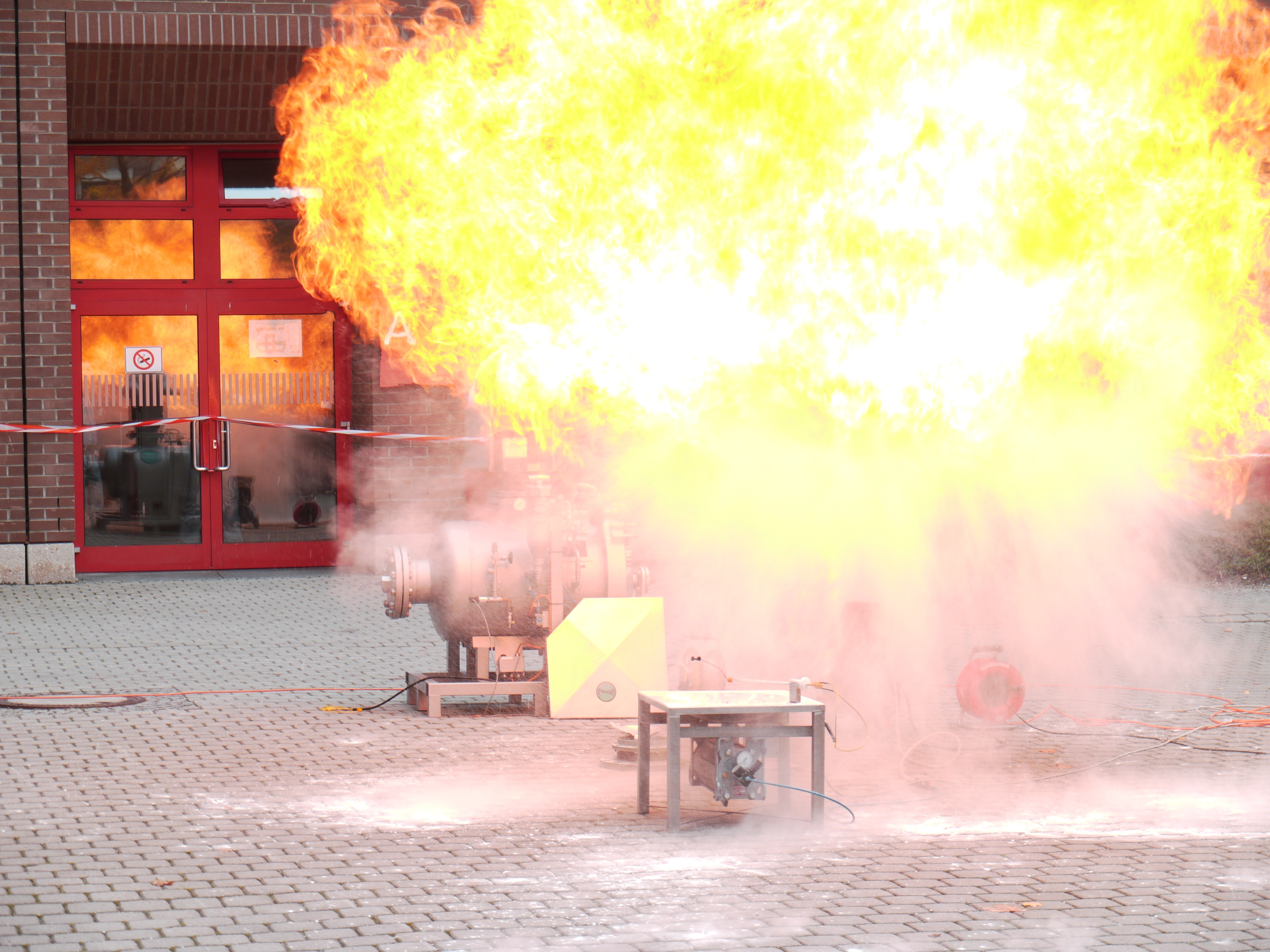
Intense radiant heat has nothing to ignite here

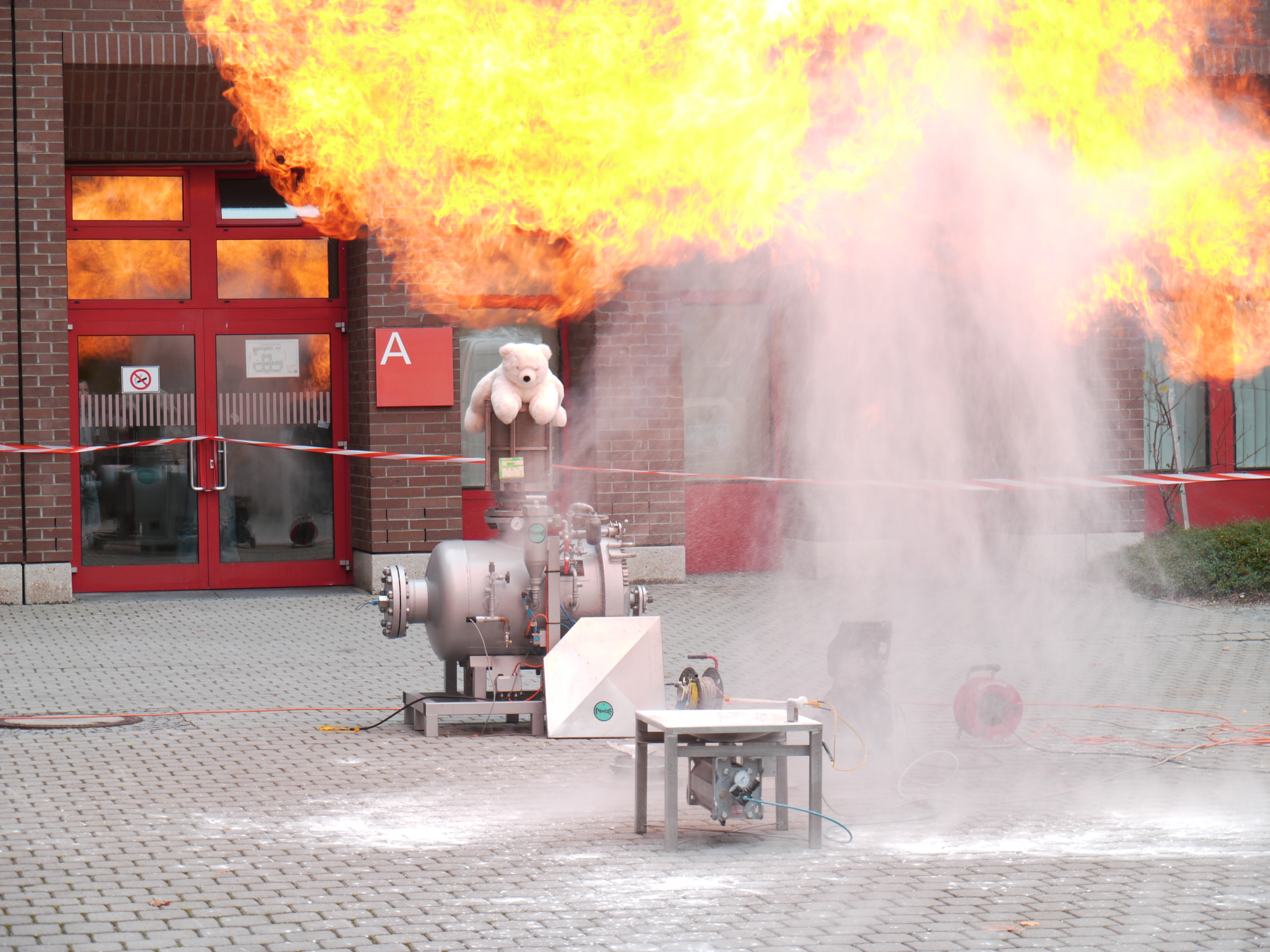
Fireball and superheated gases rise

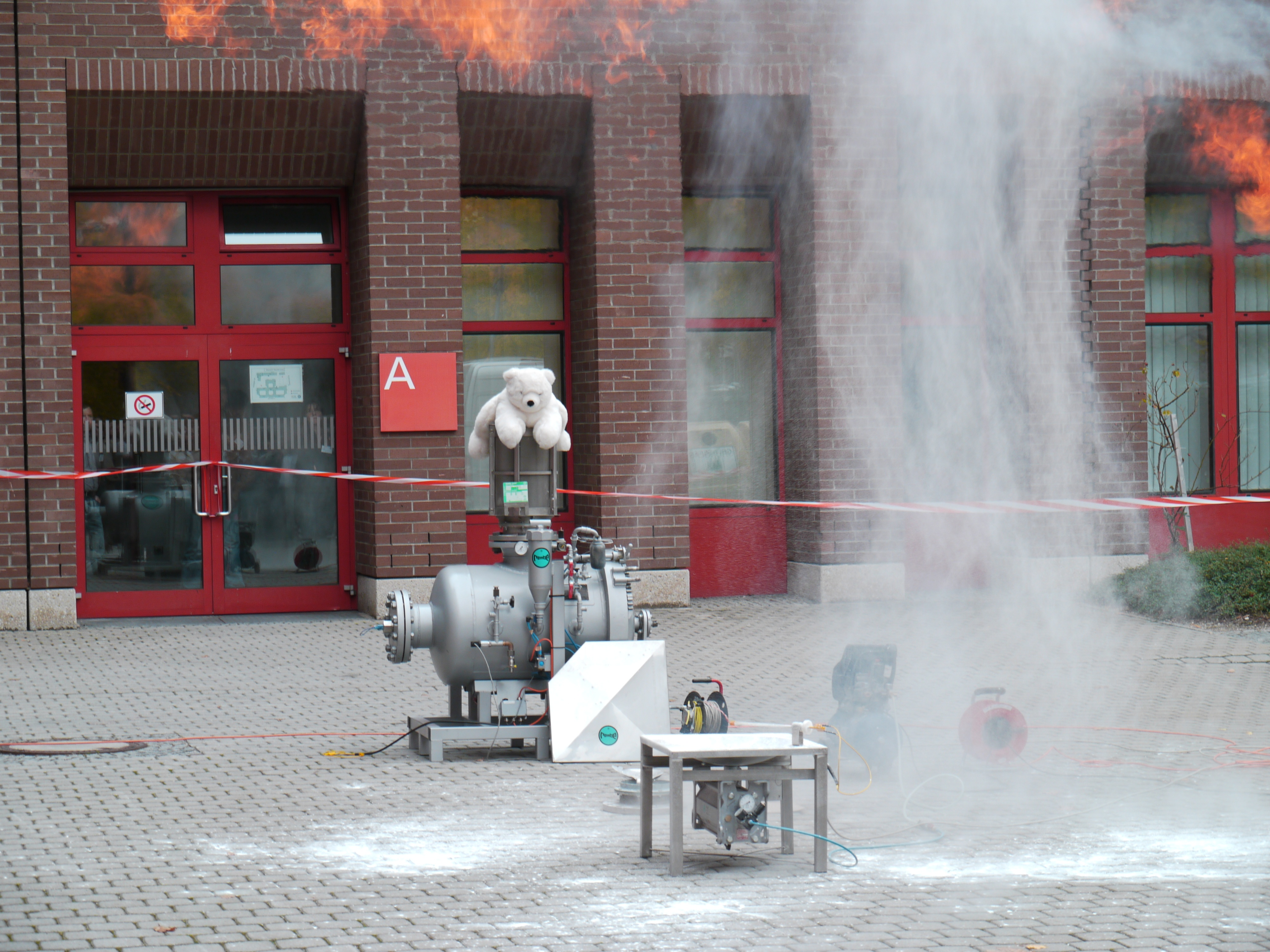
Aftermath of explosion, with unburnt flour on the ground

== Effects ==
A dust explosion can cause major damage to structures, equipment, and personnel from violent overpressure or shockwave effects. Flying objects and debris can cause further damage. Intense radiant heat from a fireball can ignite the surroundings, or cause severe skin burns in unprotected persons. In a tightly enclosed space, the sudden depletion of oxygen can cause asphyxiation. Where the dust is carbon based (such as in a coal mine), incomplete combustion may cause large amounts of carbon monoxide (the miners' after-damp) to be created. This can cause more deaths than the original explosion as well as hindering rescue attempts.

== Protection and mitigation ==
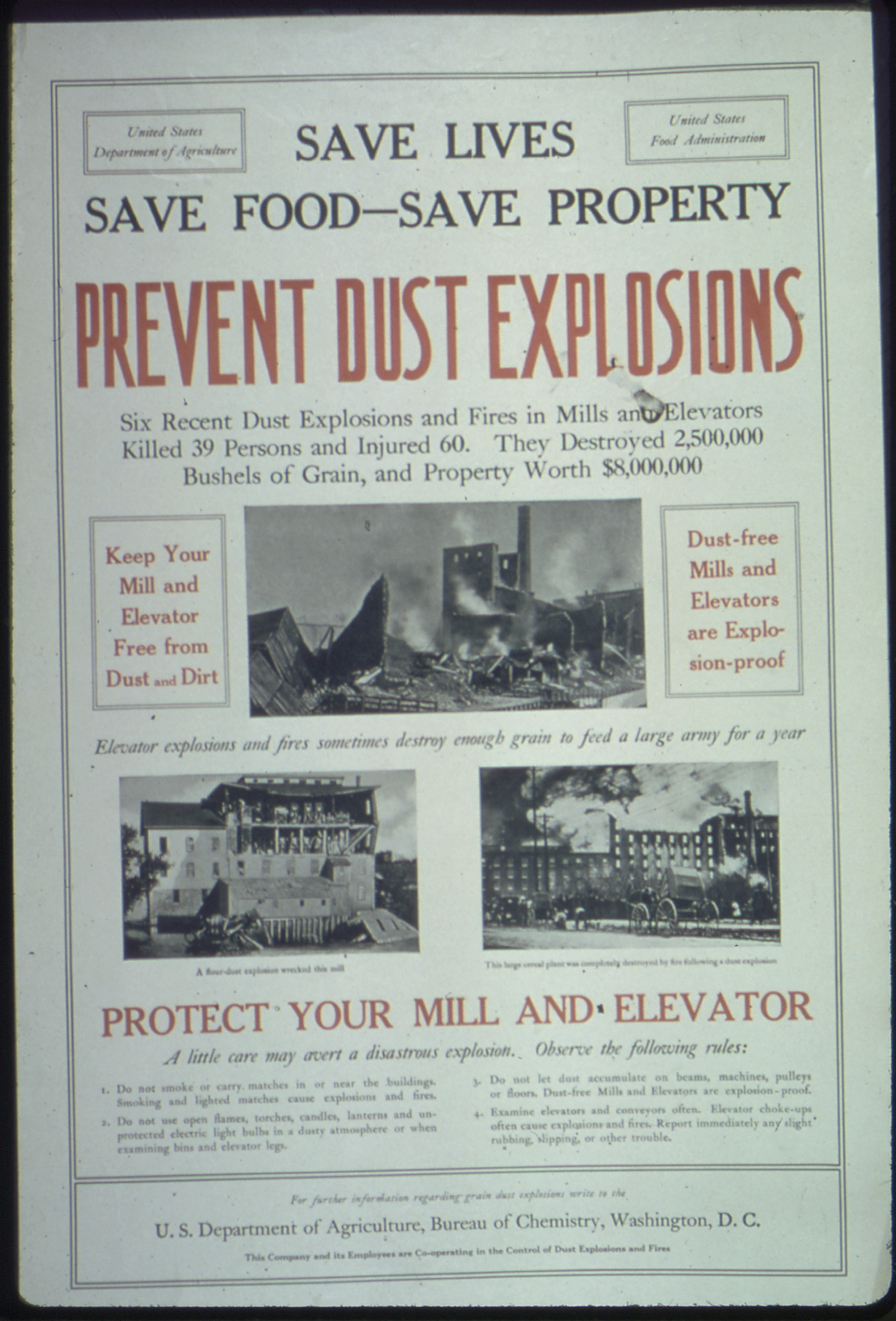
This American poster during World War I warned about grain dust explosions

Much research has been carried out in Europe and elsewhere to understand how to control these dangers, but dust explosions still occur. The alternatives for making processes and plants safer depend on the industry.

In the coal mining industry, a methane explosion can initiate a coal dust explosion, which can then engulf an entire mine pit. As a precaution, incombustible stone dust may be spread along mine roadways, or stored in trays hanging from the roof, to dilute the coal dust stirred up by a shockwave to the point where it cannot burn. Mines may also be sprayed with water to inhibit ignition.

Some industries exclude oxygen from dust-raising processes, a precaution known as "inerting". Typically this uses nitrogen, carbon dioxide, or argon, which are incombustible gases which can displace oxygen. The same method is also used in large storage tanks where flammable vapors can accumulate. However, use of oxygen-free gases brings a risk of asphyxiation of the workers. Workers who need illumination in enclosed spaces where a dust explosion is a high risk often use lamps designed for underwater divers, as they have no risk of producing an open spark due to their sealed waterproof design.

Good housekeeping practices, such as eliminating build-up of combustible dust deposits with a dust collector, also help mitigate the problem.

Best engineering control measures which can be found in the National Fire Protection Association (NFPA) Combustible Dust Standards include:

- Wetting
- Oxidant concentration reduction
- Deflagration venting
- Deflagration pressure containment
- Deflagration suppression
- Deflagration venting through a dust retention and flame-arresting device

== Notable incidents ==
Dust clouds are a common source of explosions, causing an estimated 2,000 explosions annually in Europe. The table lists notable incidents worldwide.

Event	Date	Location	Country	Source material	Fatalities	Injuries	Notes
Giacomelli Flour Warehouse explosion	December 14, 1785	Turin	Italy	flour dust	0	2	Documented by Count Morozzo in the Memoirs of the Academy of Sciences of Turin. One of the earliest scientifically documented flour dust explosions. Occurred when a boy stirring flour by lamplight created a dust cloud that ignited. The explosion damaged the bakery and caused injuries, including burns to one boy and a broken leg to another who jumped from a scaffold. Count Morozzo attributed the explosion to extremely dry flour (after 5-6 months without rain) and provided an early scientific explanation of dust explosions.
Tradeston Flour Mills explosion	July 9, 1872	Glasgow, Scotland	United Kingdom	grain dust	18	16	Destroyed the mill building and damaged surrounding buildings, and started a fire that killed others. The investigation into the explosion was published across Europe and the Americas.
Great Mill Disaster	May 2, 1878	Minneapolis, Minnesota	United States	grain dust	18		Destroyed the largest grain mill in the world and leveled five other mills, effectively reducing the milling capacity of Minneapolis by one-third to one-half. Prompted mills throughout the country to install better ventilation systems to prevent dust build-up.
Husted Mill and Elevator Disaster	June 24, 1913	Buffalo, New York	United States	grain dust	33	80	This workday afternoon explosion destroyed a grain elevator and mill complex. The engineer of a passing railroad switch engine was blown from the cab and died. Windows of a passing Nickel Plate Road passenger train were broken, but no passengers were injured.
Milwaukee Works explosion	May 20, 1919	Milwaukee, Wisconsin	United States	Feed grinding plant	3	4	The blast was felt for miles around and completely leveled the plant owned by the company.
Douglas Starch Works explosion	May 22, 1919	Cedar Rapids, Iowa	United States	corn starch	43	30	The blast was felt for miles around and completely leveled the plant owned by the company.
Port Colborne explosion	August 9, 1919	Port Colborne	Canada	grain	10	16	Blast also destroyed the steamer Quebec, which was near the grain elevator.
Large terminal grain elevator in Kansas City	September 13, 1919	Kansas City, Missouri	United States		14	10	Originated in basement of elevator, during a cleanup period, and travelled up through the elevator shaft.
Mount Mulligan mine disaster	September 19, 1921	Mount Mulligan, Queensland	Australia	coal dust	75		The series of coal dust explosions within a mine rocked the close-knit township and was audible as far as 30 kilometres (19 mi) away.
Benxihu Colliery explosion	April 26, 1942	Benxi, Liaoning	Manchukuo (now China)	coal dust and gas	1,549		34% of the miners working that day were killed. This is the world's worst-ever coal-mining accident.
Pillsbury Explosion and Fire	January 2, 1972	Buffalo, New York	United States	wheat flour	3	8	New Year's weekend explosion at what was then the world's biggest flour mill. The blast occurred in a series of 500-foot-long, 10-story-tall concrete-and-steel bulk flour storage bins. Repairs took a year to complete.
Westwego grain elevator explosion	December 22, 1977	Westwego, Louisiana	United States	grain dust	36	13	
Galveston grain elevator explosion	December 27, 1977	Galveston, Texas	United States	grain dust	20		
Bird's Custard factory explosion	November 18, 1981	Banbury	United Kingdom	corn starch		9	
Metz malt factory explosion	October 18, 1982	Metz	France	barley dust	12	1	
Ingeniero White Silo Nº 5 explosion	March 13, 1985	Ingeniero White	Argentina	grain dust	22		
Harbin textile factory explosion	March 17, 1987	Harbin	China	flax dust	58	177	
Sukhodilska–Skhidna coal mine accident	June 9, 1992	Sukhodilsk	Ukraine	coal dust and firedamp	63	37	
Blaye grain explosion	August 1997	Blaye	France	grain dust	11	1	Explosion in a grain storage facility at the Société d’Exploitation Maritime Blayaise killed 11 people in nearby offices and injured one.
Debruce Grain Elevator explosion	June 1998	Wichita, Kansas	United States	grain dust	7	10	Multiple explosions occurred in what was then the world's largest grain elevator. Dust collection systems were not properly maintained.
West Pharmaceutical Services explosion	January 29, 2003	Kinston, North Carolina	United States	polyethylene dust	6	38	
CTA Acoustics dust explosion	February 20, 2003	Corbin, Kentucky	United States	resin dust	7	37	Employees were doing housekeeping measures when a oven was left open, small fires caused by resin dust were common, the dust was blown into the extractor, and into the oven which caused the explosion.
Imperial Sugar explosion	February 7, 2008	Port Wentworth, Georgia	United States	sugar dust	14	42	
2014 Kunshan explosion	August 2, 2014	Kunshan	China	metal powder	146	114	
Formosa Fun Coast explosion	June 27, 2015	New Taipei	Taiwan	colored starch powder	15	498	Explosion when Holi-like colored powder was released at an outdoor music and color festival at the Formosa Fun Coast.
Bosley wood flour mill explosion	July 17, 2015	Bosley, Cheshire	United Kingdom	wood flour	4	4	
Didion Milling explosion	May 31, 2017	Cambria, Wisconsin	United States	corn dust	5	14	Corn processing facility explosion caused by a smouldering nest within improperly maintained processing equipment.

== See also ==
- Air to fuel ratio
- Power tool
