= William de la Barre =

Austrian-born engineer (1849–1936)

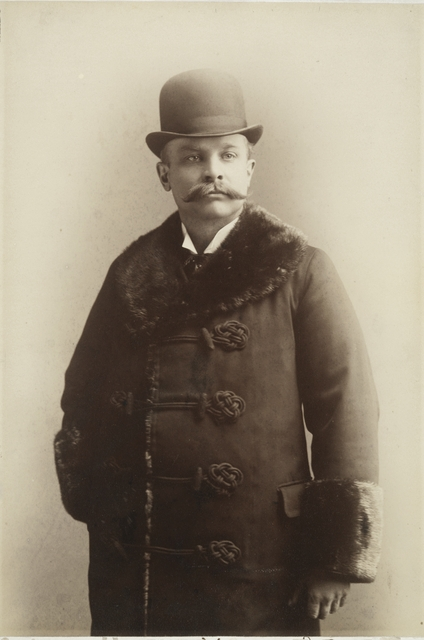
- De la Barre c. 1885
- Born: April 15, 1849
- Died: March 24, 1936 (aged 86)
- Known for: revolutionizing flour milling
- Spouse: Louisa Verena Merian (m. 1870)
- Children: 3

William de la Barre (April 15, 1849, in Vienna – March 24, 1936, in Minneapolis) was an Austrian Empire-born civil engineer who developed a new process for milling wheat into flour, using energy-saving steel rollers at the Washburn-Crosby Mills (now known as General Mills, Inc.) in Minneapolis, and later served as chief engineer for the first hydroelectric power station built in the United States, at Saint Anthony Falls, also in Minneapolis.

== Early life ==
William de la Barre, son of Carl and Josephine (Friedl) de la Barre, was born in Vienna, Austria, on April 15, 1849. In 1863, he entered the Polytechnic Institute in Vienna (now known as the Vienna University of Technology), where he studied for two years before being recruited into the Austrian Empire Navy as a machinist. In the Navy, he received his first mechanical experience and training. De la Barre immigrated to the United States in October 1866, landing in New York, then settling in Philadelphia, Pennsylvania, where he found employment as a draftsman and engineer. He served as engineer for the Centennial Exposition held in Philadelphia in 1876. He married Louisa Verena Merian, daughter of Louis and Marie (Glaser) Merian of Philadelphia, in 1870 in Philadelphia. They had three children.

== Career ==
In 1878, he and his family moved to Minneapolis, Minnesota. He became a salesman for Behrns' Exhaust, a patented apparatus for the prevention of dust explosions in flour mills, and for several years sold and installed this apparatus in various mills in Minneapolis. Because of his extensive knowledge of flour mills, in 1880 he was hired by Cadwallader C. Washburn (better known as C. C. Washburn), founder of the Washburn-Crosby Mills in Minneapolis, to be head engineer and superintendent of his mills. While at the Centennial Exposition in Philadelphia, de la Barre had learned that a new process for milling flour had been invented in Europe that involved passing the grain through a series of rollers, rather than the large round millstones used in America. Washburn sent him to Europe to learn about the process firsthand. What de la Barre discovered was that in Hungary, the mills were using large porcelain rollers shaped more or less like rolling pins and that each series of rollers ground the grain finer and finer. On his return to Minneapolis, de la Barre designed rollers made from steel instead of porcelain. Using de la Barre's steel rollers, the Washburn-Crosby Mills could mill flour that was cleaner, more uniform, and with less energy than ever before. The process was no less than a revolution in milling.

De la Barre was elected president of the combined Pillsbury-Washburn mills in 1921. After they were bought out by Northern States Power, De la Barre served in NSP management until he died at eighty-six in 1936.
