= West Pharmaceutical Services explosion =

2003 industrial disaster in North Carolina, US

Coordinates: 35.3173°N 77.6140°W

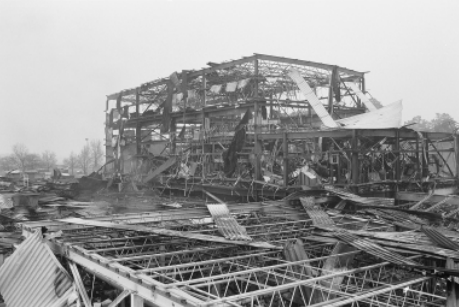
Remains of the West Pharmaceutical Services facility's rubber compounding unit

The West Pharmaceutical Plant explosion was an industrial disaster that occurred on January 29, 2003, at the West Pharmaceutical Plant in Kinston, North Carolina, United States. Six people were killed and thirty-six people were injured when a large explosion ripped through the facility. Two firefighters were injured in the subsequent blaze. The disaster occurred twelve years and 170 miles (270 km) from the 1991 Hamlet chicken processing plant fire, North Carolina's second-worst industrial disaster.

== Background ==
The West Pharmaceutical Plant was owned by West Pharmaceutical Services, and opened in the early 1980s. The plant employed 255 people with wages of between $12 and $14, some of the highest in the area. The facility's purpose was trifold; to manufacture syringe plungers, to manufacture intravenous components, and rubber compounding. In October 2002, an inspector found a total of 22 "serious violations" at the plant, but said that these were routine findings for numerous industrial premises in North Carolina. West Pharmaceutical Services was fined $10,000 as a result.

As part of the manufacturing process, rubber strips were doused in a solution of polyethylene powder and water to reduce their stickiness and then blown dry. This led to polyethylene dust being dispersed around the plant. While dust was regularly cleaned from visible surfaces in the production area, some was sucked in by air intakes and collected above the facility's dropped tile ceiling.

== Explosion ==
The plant was ripped apart by a violent explosion. Witnesses reported hearing "a sound like rolling thunder", as what was later determined to be a chain reaction of explosions rapidly propagated. The shock wave broke windows at distances of up to 1,000 feet (300 m) away, and propelled debris as far as 2 miles (3.2 km), some of which started additional fires in wooded areas at this distance. The blast could be felt 25 miles (40 km) away. A student at a school over half a mile away was injured by glass fragments.

The explosion severed the plant's sprinkler system water supply, rendering it inoperable. A large fire raged for two days at the site of the plant. Damage to the plant was estimated to cost around $150 million. One half of the 150,000-square-foot (14,000 m^{2}) plant was completely destroyed.

== Investigation ==
The investigation initially focused on two separate possibilities: a failure of a newly installed gas line, and a large dust explosion. From an early stage, the main theory pursued was that of the dust explosion. Within 24 hours of the explosion, the Chemical Safety and Hazard Investigation Board, who conducted the investigation, had determined from eyewitness interviews that the explosion originated in an area known as the "Automated Compounding System". This was a synthetic rubber-processing system. It was the site for mixing, rolling, coating, and drying of a type of rubber called polyisoprene. The process adds oils and fillers to the material, as well as creating significant quantities of dust. Therefore, the working theory from an early point was the rubber dust explosion theory.

One particular machine was identified. It coated strips of rubber by dipping in "Acumist", a finely powdered grade of combustible polyethylene. This machine had operated for 24 hours a day, five or six days a week, since 1987. The spaces around the machine, including a suspended ceiling 3 feet (0.91 m) above the machine, were regularly cleaned by the factory's maintenance personnel. But they were unaware that ventilation systems within the room pulled the dust up into the ceiling, where a layer 0.25 to 0.5 inches (6.4 to 12.7 mm) thick had accumulated. Several weeks prior to the accident, maintenance personnel did notice a thick coating of dust on surfaces above the suspended ceiling, but failed to realize the imminent danger it posed.

Investigators determined that a major explosion occurred when something disturbed the dust, creating a cloud, which ignited. The investigation was unable to determine what disturbed the dust or what ignited it, due to the extensive damage at the plant. However, it is known that the machine had suffered multiple internal fires, including one that was powerful enough to blow off the mixer door. Four other theories were developed regarding possible causes: a batch of rubber that overheated and ignited; an electrical ballast or light fixture that ignited accumulated dust; a spark caused by a possible electrical fault; or ignition of dust in a cooling air duct feeding an electric motor.

It was determined that West had in their possession material safety data sheets (MSDSs) supplied by the powder manufacturer that warned of the danger of such explosions, but did not refer to them. Instead, they relied on the MSDS supplied by Crystal Inc. PMC, who supplied West with a polyethylene-water slurry. However, this second MSDS neglected to mention the hazard posed by dust, as it was not thought to be hazardous once the slurry had dried.

The final report into the disaster was highly critical of West, saying that the four "root causes" of the disaster were West's inadequate engineering assessment for combustible powders, inadequate consultation with fire safety standards, lack of appropriate review of MSDSs, and inadequate communication of dust hazards to workers. It also criticized West for not investigating a minor incident in which dust ignited during welding, from which West could have realized the imminent danger posed by the dust.

=== Recommendations ===
The final report made a number of recommendations to prevent a recurrence. A brief summary:

- North Carolina's Building Code Council should adopt NFPA 654, a set of building codes which controls operations in environments involving large quantities of combustible dust. In particular, it limits combustible dust accumulations to 1/32 inch (0.79 mm).
- North Carolina's Department of Labor should identify industries at risk of future explosions, and educate people involved with these industries about the potential risk of dust explosions.
- North Carolina fire and building code officials should be trained to recognize the hazards posed by flammable dust.
- West Pharmaceuticals should improve its material safety review procedures, revise its project engineering practices, communicate with its workers about combustible dust hazards, and follow safety practices contained in NFPA 654 at all company facilities that use combustible powders.
- Crystal inc. PMC should modify their MSDSs to discuss the hazards posed by potential dust explosions.

== Aftermath ==
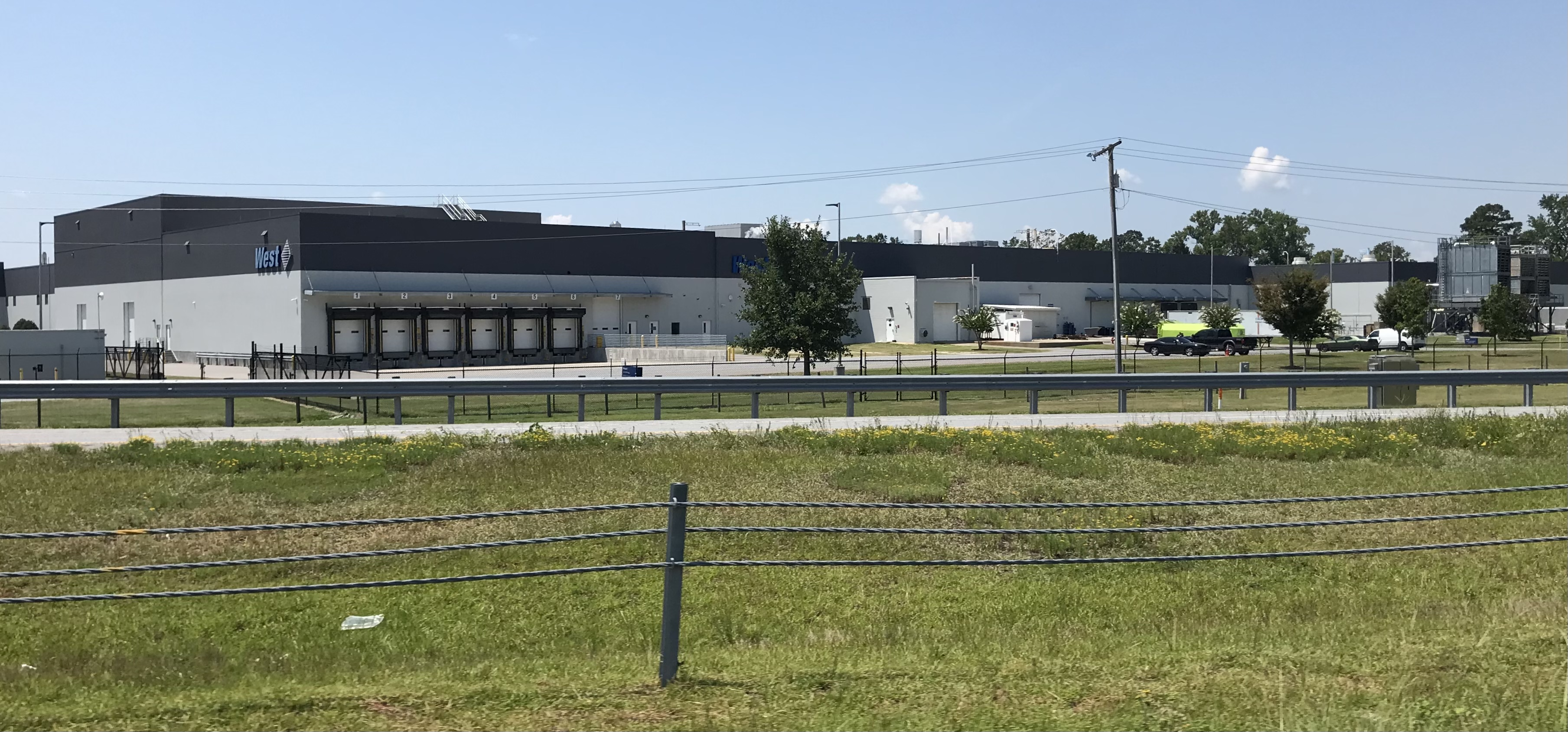
The rebuilt West Pharmaceutical Services facility in 2025

Less than a week after the disaster, the local county commission voted to donate $600,000 to West to rebuild. A local landlord also offered temporary free office space to company executives.

On February 20, 2003, a private memorial service entitled "A Service of Healing and Remembrance" was held at Lenoir Community College, Kinston, for surviving plant employees and their families.

The plant was so severely damaged that it had to be demolished and rebuilt from scratch.

One year into the investigation, the disaster, coupled with the CTA Acoustics fiberglass insulation manufacturing plant explosion and the Hayes Lemmerz automotive parts plant explosion (with death tolls of seven and one respectively, also involving dust explosions in 2003), prompted the Chemical Safety and Hazard Investigation Board (CSB) to conduct a study into the number and severity of dust explosions throughout the United States over several decades. The board's chairman, Carolyn Merritt, described the accidents as collectively raising "safety questions of national significance... Workers and workplaces need to be protected from this insidious hazard". The study reviewed how the dust explosion hazard was controlled by regulatory codes, standards, and good operating practices, and also compared the US response to other nations' solutions to the same problem, in order to produce a review of potential initiatives to reduce the occurrence of industrial dust explosions. Lawsuits followed, with Scott Scurfield providing litigation defense for West Pharmaceutical Services.

In 2004, Science Channel broadcast a documentary about the explosion and subsequent investigation, titled Failure Analysis: Dust Explosion. The CSB expressed their approval of the documentary, saying that it would "help spread the word about the dangers of combustible dust in the workplace".

== See also ==
- List of explosions
