= List of explosions =

This is a list of accidental explosions and facts about each one, grouped by the time of their occurrence. It does not include explosions caused by terrorist attacks or arson, as well as intentional explosions for civil or military purposes. It may still include entries for which the cause is unclear or still under investigation.

For a list based on power or death toll see largest artificial non-nuclear explosions or the explosions section of list of accidents and disasters by death toll. This list also contains notable explosions that would not qualify for the articles mentioned above and is more detailed, especially for the latest centuries.

== Prior to 2000 ==
Date	Country	Location	Dead	Injured	Details
11 June 1554	Duchy of Luxembourg	Luxembourg City	2+	Unknown	1554 Luxembourg explosion - a lightning strike caused the explosion of barrels of gunpowder stored in a church attic, setting fires that destroyed a large part of the city.
11 March 1597	Kingdom of Ireland	Dublin	126–200	Hundreds	Dublin gunpowder explosion – 140 barrels of gunpowder, needed by the English army then fighting the Nine Years' War (1593–1603), exploded on the quays of Dublin and on Winetavern Street, destroying many buildings.
30 May 1626	China (Ming dynasty)	Beijing	20,000	Unknown	Wanggongchang Explosion – A Shenjiying armory of gunpowder and ammunition exploded during the late reign of the Tianqi Emperor.
12 September 1634	(Sovereign Military Order of Malta) Malta	Valletta	22	Unknown	1634 Valletta explosion – A gunpowder factory blew up, damaging several buildings including a church and a college.
24 April 1648	(Kingdom of England) England	Norwich	c. 80–200 (reports vary)	Hundreds	Great Blow – 98 barrels of gunpowder were accidentally detonated during a pro-royalist riot during the Second English Civil War.
12 October 1654	Dutch Republic	Delft	100+	Thousands	Delft Explosion – A gunpowder magazine blew up, destroying a large part of the city.
18 August 1769	Republic of Venice	Brescia	c. 400–3,000 (reports vary)	800+	Brescia explosion – A gunpowder store blew up after being hit by lightning, destroying a large part of the city.
31 August 1794	France	Paris	1000+	Unknown	A gunpowder store blew up in the Château de Grenelle
18 July 1806	(United Kingdom) Malta	Birgu	c. 150–240	c. 100	1806 Birgu polverista explosion – A gunpowder magazine blew up, destroying part of the city's fortifications and many buildings.
12 January 1807	Netherlands	Leiden	151	Unknown	Leiden gunpowder disaster – A ship carrying black powder for the Dutch Army during the War of the Fourth Coalition exploded.
3 November 1810	United Kingdom	Cork	22	40+	Cork gunpowder explosion
28 February 1844	United States	Potomac River	6	16–20	USS Princeton Disaster of 1843 – A gun on board USS Princeton exploded during a demonstration. The disaster endangered U.S. President John Tyler and killed several members of his Cabinet.
23 October 1844	United States	near New Albany, Indiana	56–100+	Unknown	Lucy Walker steamboat disaster – The Lucy Walker blew up in a boiler explosion on the Ohio River. The incident led to the U.S. federal government establishing steamboat safety regulations, including the Steamboat Inspection Service.
14 July 1847	United Kingdom	Faversham, England	18	Unknown	Faversham guncotton explosion – A guncotton factory in Faversham, one of the British Empire's primary munitions centers exploded.
13 September 1848	United States	Rutland Railroad, south of Cavendish, Vermont	0	Phineas Gage	Gage was setting a rock blast when a 1.25-inch-thick (3.2 cm), 3-foot-7-inch-long (1.1 m), 13.25 lb (6.01 kg) iron rod rocketed upward into the left side of his face then completely out the top of the skull, destroying most of his frontal lobes. Comparisons of Gage's life before and after the accident are often discussed in the field of mind–body dualism.
6 October 1854	United Kingdom	Newcastle upon Tyne and Gateshead, England	c. 53 (in fire and explosion)	c. 400–500 (in fire and explosion)	Great fire of Newcastle and Gateshead – During a large fire, a bonded warehouse used to store combustibles such as sulphur and nitrate of soda exploded, killing onlookers and destroying the neighborhood.
17 July 1856	United States	Whitemarsh Township	59–67	c. 100	Great Train Wreck of 1856 – Two steam trains traveling on the North Pennsylvania Railroad collide head-on, causing the deadliest railroad crash at that time.
17 September 1862	United States	Pittsburgh, Pennsylvania	78	Unknown	Allegheny Arsenal explosion – A Union Army ordnance depot exploded, causing the largest civilian casualty of the American Civil War.
27 April 1865	United States	near Memphis, Tennessee	1,198	c. 760	Sultana steamboat disaster – An overloaded side-wheel steamboat carrying Union soldiers from Confederate prison camps burned down and sank in the Mississippi River after its four boilers exploded. The Sultana disaster remains the worst maritime disaster in American history.
25 May 1865	United States	Mobile, Alabama	c. 300	Unknown	Mobile magazine explosion – A former Confederate Army ordnance depot exploded.
12 December 1866	United Kingdom	Stairfoot, England	361	Unknown	Oaks explosion – A colliery in South Yorkshire suffered a series of explosions, causing one of the worst mining disasters in British history.
9 July 1872	United Kingdom	Glasgow, Scotland	18	16+	Tradeston Flour Mills explosion – A mill owned by Matthew Muir & Sons company suffered a dust explosion.
13 May 1873	Canada	Westville, Nova Scotia	70	Unknown	Drummond Mine explosion – Canada's largest colliery exploded after a coal fire grew out of control.
10 October 1874	United Kingdom	Regent's Park, London, England	4	Unknown	Regent's Park explosion – The barge Tilbury, carrying both petroleum and gunpowder, exploded, killing its crew and causing extensive damage.
2 May 1878	United States	Minneapolis, Minnesota	18	Hundreds	Great Mill Disaster - World's largest flour mill exploded from accumulation of flour dust.
4 September 1885	Canada	Douro, Ontario	2	0	1885 Dynamite explosion – A wagon load of dynamite exploded during transport.
3 May 1887	Canada	Nanaimo, British Columbia	150	Unknown	1887 Nanaimo mine explosion – A coal mine exploded in an explosives accident and killed 150 miners, including 53 Chinese Canadian laborers.
15 July 1890	United States	Kings Mills, Ohio	11	About 100	1890 Kings Mills powder explosion – Freight cars on the Little Miami Railroad collided with cars containing gunpowder and cartridges from the King Powder Company and the Peters Cartridge Company.
26 August 1892	United Kingdom	Aberkenfig, Wales	112	Unknown	Parc Slip Colliery explosion – A coal mine operated by John Brogden and Sons exploded.
16 February 1896	South African Republic	Braamfontein	70–75	200+	Braamfontein Explosion – A freight train loaded with dynamite explodes in a railway siding in a Johannesburg suburb.
30 April 1896	United Kingdom	Micklefield, England	63	Unknown	Peckfield Colliery disaster
30 January 1900	United States	near Trenton, Michigan	1	2	Sibley Quarry explosion
1 May 1900	United States	Scofield, Utah	200–246	Unknown	Scofield Mine disaster – A coal mine was destroyed in a dust explosion, killing 200 workers from either the explosion or from asphyxiation after being trapped in the mine.
10 March 1906	France	Courrières	1,099	Unknown	Courrières mine disaster – A coal dust explosion caused the worst mining disaster in Europe and led to a national outcry in France.
21 December 1910	United Kingdom	Westhoughton, England	344	Unknown	Pretoria Pit disaster - Underground explosion occurred at the Hulton Colliery Bank Pit No. 3, known as the Pretoria Pit, then in the historic county of Lancashire. A total of 344 men and boys lost their lives.
7 March 1913	United States	Baltimore, Maryland	33	60	Alum Chine explosion – Dynamite exploded aboard the SS Alum Chine in Baltimore Harbor.
14 October 1913	United Kingdom	Senghenydd, Wales	439	Unknown	Senghenydd colliery disaster – A coal dust explosion occurred at a coal mine in the South Wales Coalfield.
15 December 1914	Japan	Hōjō, Fukuoka, Kyushu	687	Unknown	Hōjō Coal Mine Disaster – A Mitsubishi coal mine in the Chikuhō coalfield exploded, causing Japan's worst mining disaster.
2 April 1916	United Kingdom	Faversham, England	115	Unknown	Faversham Great Explosion – 200 tons of TNT manufactured by an Admiralty factory for use in World War I exploded.
6 December 1917	Canada	Halifax, Nova Scotia	1,950	9,000	Halifax Explosion – The SS Mont-Blanc, a French cargo ship loaded with high explosives sailing between New York City and Bordeaux, exploded after colliding with the Norwegian ship SS Imo. The disaster was the largest man-made explosion of the time and caused extensive damage to Richmond, Dartmouth, and the Miꞌkmaq neighborhood of Tufts Cove.
4-6 October 1918	United States	Sayreville, New Jersey	~100	100+	T. A. Gillespie Company Shell Loading Plant explosion – Munitions explosion at an ammunition plant in New Jersey
21 September 1921	Germany	Ludwigshafen	500–600	2,000	Oppau explosion – A tower silo loaded with 4,000 tons of ammonium nitrate and ammonium sulfate exploded at a BASF plant.
1 March 1924	United States	Nixon, New Jersey	20	2	1924 Nixon Nitration Works disaster – An ammonium nitrate processing plant managed by Lewis Nixon exploded, destroying the town of Nixon.
10 March 1930	United Kingdom	Allerton Bywater, Yorkshire, England	5	1	Allerton Bywater colliery explosion
14 May 1934	British Hong Kong	West Point	42	100+	A gasometer belonging to the Hong Kong and China Gas Company exploded, igniting nearby residential homes.
18 March 1937	United States	New London, Texas	295+	300+	New London School explosion
26 April 1942	(Taiwan) China	Benxihu Colliery, Liaoning Province	1,549	Unknown	1942 Benxihu Colliery disaster – Explosion at a coal mine in the Japanese-occupied colliery.
5 June 1942	United States	Elwood, Illinois	48	67	Explosion at Elwood Ordnance Plant.
6 November 1942	United States	Perinton, New York	12	Unknown	Explosion at fireworks factory.
12 December 1942	United States	Burlington, Iowa	16	30	Explosion at ordnance plant.
14 April 1944	British India	Bombay	800+	3,000+	1944 Bombay Explosion – A British Fort ship exploded in Bombay Harbour.
21 May 1944	United States	Pearl Harbor, Hawaiʻi	163	396	West Loch disaster – Munitions on a landing ship in the West Loch of Pearl Harbor exploded, triggering a chain reaction that sank six vessels in total.
4 July 1944	Denmark	Aarhus	39	250	1944 explosion in Aarhus
17 July 1944	United States	Port Chicago, California	320	390+	Port Chicago disaster – Munitions intended for the Pacific Front of World War II exploded during loading on a ship at a U.S. Navy magazine, killing hundreds of workers and numerous African Americans. One month later the unsafe conditions that caused the disaster led to a mutiny.
20 October 1944	United States	Cleveland, Ohio	131	225	Cleveland East Ohio Gas explosion
27 November 1944	United Kingdom	Staffordshire, England	~70	~20	RAF Fauld explosion – An underground Royal Air Force ordnance depot exploded, causing the United Kingdom's largest ever explosion.
9 May 1945	United States	Sunnyside, Utah	23	Unknown	Gas explosion at the Sunnyside Fuel Company's #1 mine.
25 May 1945	United States	Aberdeen, Maryland	12	~50	1945 Edgewood Arsenal explosion
21 May 1945	Australia	Wagga Wagga, New South Wales	26	unknown	Kapooka Army Base soldiers received instructions for demolition work in a bunker which was 3 metres (9.8 ft) below the ground when an explosion took place, resulting in Australia's largest military funeral.
31 August 1945	Italy	Ancona	100+	Unknown	Train explosion. The cause of the event was unclear, but reports from the Liverpool Daily Post said that smoke was reported before the explosion.
14 September 1945	Canada	Montreal, Quebec	11	42+	Explosion at a warehouse.
18 July 1946	United States	Onset, Massachusetts	9	60+	Gas explosion at Christy's Spa.
20 February 1947	United States	Los Angeles, California	17	100+	O'Connor Plating Works disaster
16 April 1947	United States	Texas City, Texas	581	5,000+	Texas City disaster
18 August 1947	Spain	Cádiz	147+	5,000+	Cádiz Explosion
10 April 1949	United States	Marion, South Dakota	6	50+	Gas furnace explosion at St. Mary's Catholic Church, during a Palm Sunday service.
14 December 1949	United States	Sioux City, Iowa	21	90+	Natural gas explosion at Swift & Company meatpacking plant.
25 May 1950	United States	Chicago	34	50	1950 Chicago streetcar crash
11 June 1955	France	Le Mans	84	180	1955 Le Mans disaster
7 August 1956	Colombia	Cali	1,300–4,000	4,000–12,000	Cali explosion
29 March 1956	United States	Philadelphia, Pennsylvania	3	100	Tidewater grain elevator explosion
1 July 1959	Mexico	Coatzacoalcos	12	100	Pipeline explosion.
9 May 1960	China	Datong, Shanxi province	684	Unknown	Explosion at a coal mine.
24 October 1960	Soviet Union	Baikonur Cosmodrome	92–126	120	Nedelin catastrophe
1 August 1963	Canada	Hanmer, Ontario	8	6	1963 Hanmer explosion
31 October 1963	United States	Indianapolis	81	400	1963 Indiana State Fairgrounds Coliseum gas explosion – Caused by a leak stemming from improperly stored liquefied petroleum gas tanks at the Indiana State Fairgrounds Coliseum.
6 July 1964	United States	Edinburg, Pennsylvania	5	Unknown	1964 American Cyanamid explosion – Caused by an ignition of chemical materials within the facility.
1 March 1965	Canada	LaSalle, Quebec	28	39	LaSalle Heights disaster
6 April 1968	United States	Richmond, Indiana	41	150+	Richmond, Indiana explosion
16 May 1968	United Kingdom	Canning Town, London	4	17	Ronan Point — caused by gas leak and faulty construction
30 December 1970	United States	Leslie County, Kentucky	39	Unknown	Hurricane Creek mine disaster
21 October 1971	United Kingdom	Clarkston, Scotland	22	100	Clarkston explosion
30 August 1972	Australia	Taroom, Queensland	3	0	1972 Taroom explosion
30 October 1972	United States	Lake City, Minnesota	6	9	A ruptured gas line caused the explosion of the Ben Franklin store.
2 February 1973	United States	Eagle Grove, Iowa	13	Unknown	A natural gas explosion destroyed the Chatterbox Cafe and Coast-to-Coast hardware store. A firefighter also died of a heart attack after arriving at the scene.
10 February 1973	United States	Staten Island, New York	40	0	1973 Staten Island gas explosion
28 April 1973	United States	Roseville, California	0	48	1973 Roseville Yard Disaster
27 March 1974	Portuguese Mozambique	Magude	70	200	Magude train disaster
1 June 1974	United Kingdom	North Lincolnshire	28	36	Flixborough Disaster
1 February 1976	Poland	Gdańsk	17	11	Gas explosion caused the collapse of a 2-storey residential building.
9 March 1976	United States	Oven Fork, Kentucky	26	unknown	Scotia Mine disaster
30 May 1976	Luxembourg	Pfaffenthal, Luxembourg City	3	20+	Pfaffenthal explosion – the massive release of gasoline into a sewer caused a series of explosions several kilometers away when the fumes were ignited.
11 November 1977	South Korea	Iksan	59	1343	Iri station explosion
17 February 1978	France	Paris	12	60	A gas leak in rue Raynouard caused 3 explosions in 40 minutes.
11 July 1978	Spain	Alcanar	215-243	200+	Los Alfaques disaster
15 February 1979	Poland	Warsaw	49	135	1979 Warsaw gas explosion
18 September 1980	United States	Damascus, Arkansas	1	21	1980 Damascus Titan missile explosion
23 October 1980	Spain	Ortuella	67	100+	An explosion alleged to have been caused by a welding accident at the Marcelino Ugalde School. Most of the dead were children.
16 November 1980	Thailand	Dusit District, Bangkok	60	400	A series of explosions at an army munitions depot.
25 November 1980	Turkey	Danaciobasi, Kırıkkale Province	105	unknown	Explosion at an engagement party.
9 December 1980	Poland	Karlino	0	1	Karlino oil eruption
13 February 1981	United States	Louisville, Kentucky	0	4	Louisville sewer explosions
17 August 1982	Spain	Luanco, Asturias	11	10	Gas explosion in El Bodegón bar. Among the dead were footballer Rafael De Diego and some of his relatives.
27 May 1983	United States	Benton, Tennessee	11	1	Benton fireworks disaster
23 May 1984	United Kingdom	Lancashire	16	28	Abbeystead disaster
7 September 1984	Malta	off Qala	7	1	C23 tragedy
19 November 1984	Mexico	Mexico City	500–600	5,000–7,000	San Juanico disaster
28 January 1986	United States	Atlantic Ocean, off the coast of Florida	7	0	Space Shuttle Challenger disaster
8 October 1986	British Hong Kong	Kwai Chung	14	10	Cipel-Marco fur factory explosion
4 May 1988	United States	Henderson	2	372	PEPCON disaster
4 June 1988	Union of Soviet Socialist Republics	Arzamas	91	1,500	Arzamas train disaster
21 June 1988	United Kingdom	Poole, Dorset	0	14	Poole explosion
6 July 1988	United Kingdom	Aberdeen	167	Unknown	Piper Alpha explosion
12 December 1988	Mexico	La Merced, Mexico City	62+	83+	Mexico City fireworks disaster
23 December 1988	United States	Memphis, Tennessee	9	10	Memphis tanker truck disaster
4 June 1989	Union of Soviet Socialist Republics	Iglinsky District	575	800	Ufa train disaster
5 July 1990	United States	Channelview, Texas	17	5	1990 ARCO explosion
22 April 1992	Mexico	Guadalajara	252–1,000+	500–1,500+	1992 Guadalajara explosions
22 September 1993	United States	Mobile, Alabama	47	103	Big Bayou Canot rail accident
1 August 1994	China	Guangxi	77	230	1994 Kenpeng mine disaster
13 December 1994	United States	Woodbury County	4	18	Port Neal fertilizer plant explosion
3 February 1995	Malta	Cospicua	9	Unknown	An explosion on the Libyan tanker Um El Faroud killed nine dockyard workers.
17 April 1995	Poland	Gdańsk	22	12	Explosion that caused the collapse of the two lowest floors of a 10-story building.
23 June 1995	FR Yugoslavia	Zemun	11	10	Grmeč factory explosion
3 November 1995	Argentina	Río Tercero, Córdoba	7	365	Río Tercero explosion
21 November 1996	Puerto Rico	Río Piedras, Puerto Rico	33	69	Humberto Vidal explosion
14 February 1998	Cameroon	Yaoundé	200+	Unknown	Yaoundé train explosion
18 October 1998	Nigeria	Jesse, Nigeria	1,082	unknown	1998 Jesse pipeline explosion
25 September 1998	Australia	Longford	2	8	Esso Longford gas explosion
23 June 1999	United States	Pasadena	2	3	Phillips explosion of 1999
23 June 1999	Nigeria	Akute-Odo, Ogun State	15	unknown	Pipeline explosion.
9 August 1999	Canada	Calgary	2	0	Hub Oil explosion
26 September 1999	Mexico	Celaya	63	348	Celaya fireworks disaster
10 November 1999	Democratic Republic of the Congo	Mbandaka Airport	6	Unknown	An Antonov AN-12 plane owned by the Congolese military full of cluster bombs exploded on the ground at Mbandaka Airport, killing six.

== 2000s ==
Date	Country	Location	Dead	Injured	Details
7 February 2000	Nigeria	Ogwe, Abia State	17	Unknown	A pipeline explosion killed 17.
11 March 2000	Ukraine	Luhansk	81	8	Methane gas explosion at a coal mine.
13 March 2000	China	Pingxiang, Jiangxi Province	33	10	Explosion at a fireworks factory.
20 March 2000	Nigeria	Isioma, Abia State	50	Unknown	Pipeline explosion.
22 March 2000	Russia	Leninsk-Kuznetsky, Kemerovo Oblast	12	unknown	Gas explosion.
14 April 2000	Democratic Republic of the Congo	Kinshasa	109	258	Ammunition explosion at N'djili Airport which also destroyed five aircraft.
22 April 2000	China	Shanxi	40	1	Gas explosion at Yongcai coal mine.
13 May 2000	Netherlands	Enschede	20+	175+	Enschede fireworks disaster – Explosion at a fireworks warehouse.
21 June 2000	Nigeria	Okuedjeba, Warri	28	Unknown	Pipeline explosion .
11 July 2000	Nigeria	Warri	300	Unknown	Pipeline explosion caused by oil thieves.
16 July 2000	Nigeria	Ijalla, Warri	150	Unknown	Pipeline explosion.
23 July 2000	Nigeria	Sapele, Delta	40	Unknown	Pipeline explosion.
24 July 2000	Nigeria	Sapele, Delta State	15	Unknown	Pipeline explosion.
19 August 2000	United States	Carlsbad, New Mexico	12	0	Pipeline explosion killed 12 campers and destroyed three vehicles, causing $998,296 in damage.
5 November 2000	Nigeria	Oyo State	100–200	Unknown	Ibadan road tanker explosion
30 November 2000	Nigeria	Lagos	60	Unknown	Pipeline explosion caused by oil thieves.
6 March 2001	China	Fanglin, Jiangxi province	41–60	30	Fireworks explosion at a school that killed children and destroyed the building.
6 May 2001	Ukraine	Donetsk	10	26	Explosion at a coal mine.
21 September 2001	France	Toulouse	31	2500	Toulouse chemical factory explosion
23 September 2001	United States	Brookwood, Alabama	13	0	13 miners were killed.
5 November 2001	Nigeria	Imo State	15	Unknown	A pipeline leak caused an explosion.
6 December 2001	Uganda	Busesa, Iganga District	38	79	Oil tanker explosion.
27 January 2002	Nigeria	Lagos	1,100+	5,000+	2002 Lagos armoury explosion
29 January 2003	United States	Kinston, North Carolina	6	36	West Pharmaceutical Services explosion
14 April 2003	Canada	Toronto	7	4	2003 Etobicoke gas explosion
19 June 2003	Nigeria	Abia state	105	unknown	Pipeline explosion.
20 January 2004	Algeria	Skikda	27	74	An explosion at a LNG complex destroyed three trains.
18 February 2004	Iran	Nishapur	295	460	Nishapur train disaster
16 March 2004	Russia	Arkhangelsk	58	175	2004 Arkhangelsk explosion
22 April 2004	North Korea	Ryongchon County	54	1,249	Ryongchon disaster
11 May 2004	United Kingdom	Glasgow	9	33	Stockline Plastics factory explosion
24 May 2004	Romania	Mihăilești	18	13	Mihăilești explosion
30 July 2004	Belgium	Ghislenghien	24	132	A high-pressure natural gas pipeline operated at a pressure of 70 bars (1,000 pounds per square inch) ruptured following recent third-party damage.
3 November 2004	Denmark	Seest	1	24	Seest fireworks disaster
14 February 2005	China	Fuxin	214	Unknown	2005 Sunjiawan mine disaster
23 March 2005	United States	Texas City, Texas	15	170	Texas City refinery explosion
2 October 2005	Tajikistan		21	Unknown	A bus running on liquefied gas exploded when it collided with another bus.
13 November 2005	China	Jilin	6	Unknown	2005 Jilin chemical plant explosions
11 December 2005	United Kingdom	Hemel Hempstead	0	43	Buncefield fire
8 February 2006	Russia	Grozny	13	28	Chechnya Spetsnaz base explosion
12 May 2006	Nigeria	Atlas Creek Island	150	Unknown	2006 Atlas Creek pipeline explosion
18 October 2006	Indonesia	Sidoarjo, East Java	7	Unknown	A pipeline exploded because of a mud volcano.
6 December 2006	United States	Milwaukee	3	47	2006 Falk Corporation explosion
26 December 2006	Nigeria	Abule Egba	300–500	Unknown	2006 Abule Egba pipeline explosion
2 February 2007	Philippines	Tigbao, Zamboanga del Sur	50+	Unknown	A burning chemical truck exploded as a bus was passing beside it.
22 March 2007	Mozambique	Maputo	103	515	2007 Maputo arms depot explosion
1 May 2007	Spain	Palencia	9	30	Explosion in a residential building
26 July 2007	Syria	Al-Muslimiyah	15	50	July 2007 Syrian arms depot explosion
14 September 2007	Romania	Zalău	2	15	Zalău explosion
13 October 2007	Ukraine	Dnipro	9	21+	Building explosion.
19 October 2007	Philippines	Makati	11	129	2007 Glorietta explosion
18 November 2007	Saudi Arabia	Haradh	40	9	2007 Haradh, Saudi Arabia gas pipeline explosion
20 December 2007	Sierra Leone	Freetown	18	Unknown	2007 Freetown explosion
9 January 2008	Russia	Kazan	10	4	2008 Kazan gas explosion
1 February 2008	Turkey	Istanbul	22	100	Istanbul fireworks explosion
7 February 2008	United States	Port Wentworth, Georgia	14	40	2008 Georgia sugar refinery explosion
15 March 2008	Albania	Gërdec	26	300	2008 Gërdec explosions
15 May 2008	Nigeria	Lagos	39	Unknown	2008 Ijegun pipeline explosion
3 July 2008	Bulgaria	Chelopechene, Sofia Province	0	3	2008 Chelopechene explosions
10 August 2008	Canada	Toronto	2	0	Toronto propane explosion
26 August 2008	China	Yizhou	20	60	2008 Guangxi chemical plant explosions
15 November 2008	Romania	Petrila	13	13	Petrila Mine disaster
3 December 2008	Spain	Barcelona	6	42	Gas explosion in a social housing building at a shantytown.
24 December 2008	Ukraine	Yevpatoria	27	5	2008 Yevpatoria gas explosion
30 May 2009	China	Chongqing	30	59	2009 Chongqing mine blast
10 August 2009	Slovakia	Trenčín Region	20	9	2009 Handlová mine blast
23 October 2009	Puerto Rico	Bayamón	0	3	2009 Cataño oil refinery fire
1 November 2009	Benin	Porga	60+	Unknown	A tanker truck overturned and exploded while residents were siphoning its fuel.
21 November 2009	China	Hegang	108	29	2009 Heilongjiang mine explosion
2 December 2009	Ukraine	Kyiv	1	0	Vladimir Likhonos died when chewing gum he accidentally mixed with powerful explosive powder detonated in his mouth.

== 2010s ==
Date	Country	Location	Dead	Injured	Details
7 February 2010	United States	Middletown, Connecticut	6	50	2010 Connecticut power plant explosion
2 April 2010	United States	Anacortes, Washington	7	0	2010 Tesoro Anacortes Refinery disaster
5 April 2010	United States	Raleigh County, West Virginia	20	0	Upper Big Branch Mine disaster
8 May 2010	Russia	Mezhdurechensk, Kemerovo Oblast	91	99	Raspadskaya mine explosion
17 May 2010	Turkey	Zonguldak Province	30	0	2010 Zonguldak mine disaster
2 July 2010	Democratic Republic of Congo	South Kivu	230	196	2010 South Kivu fuel tank explosion
28 July 2010	China	Nanjing	13	300	2010 Nanjing chemical plant explosion
9 September 2010	United States	San Bruno, California	8	58	2010 San Bruno pipeline explosion
19 November 2010	New Zealand	Westcoast	29	2	Pike River Mine disaster
1 December 2010	Nigeria	Lagos State	20	Unknown	Alakija tanker explosion
19 December 2010	Mexico	San Martín Texmelucan	29	52	2010 Puebla oil pipeline explosion
9 February 2011	United States	Allentown, Pennsylvania	5	Unknown	A gas explosion leveled a house.
16 February 2011	Tanzania	Dar es Salaam	20-32	300	2011 Dar es Salaam explosions
11 July 2011	Cyprus	Zygi	13	62	Evangelos Florakis Naval Base explosion
29 July 2011	Ukraine	Luhansk	26	2	Suhodolskaya-Vostochnaya explosion
12 September 2011	Kenya	Nairobi	100	116	2011 Nairobi pipeline fire
12 November 2011	Iran	Bid Kaneh	17	Unknown	Bid Kaneh explosion
10 February 2012	United States	Ocala, Florida	2 (a woman and a horse)	1	Erica Marshall, a 28-year-old British veterinarian, died when the horse she was treating in a hyperbaric oxygen chamber kicked the wall, released a spark from its horseshoes, and triggered an explosion. The horse was also killed by the explosion. Another worker, Sorcha Moneley, was seriously injured.
27 February 2012	Russia	Astrakhan	10	12	2012 Astrakhan gas explosion
4 March 2012	Republic of the Congo	Brazzaville	300+	2,500+	Brazzaville arms dump blasts
12 July 2012	Nigeria	Okobie	121	75	Okobie road tanker explosion
12 July 2012	China	Yan'an	36	3	Shaanxi bus–tanker crash
27 August 2012	India	Chala	20	21	Chala LPG tanker disaster
5 September 2012	Turkey	Afyonkarahisar	25	7	2012 Afyonkarahisar arsenal explosion
5 September 2012	India	Sivakasi	40	70	Sivakasi factory explosion
18 September 2012	Mexico	Reynosa	30	46	Pipeline explosion.
1 November 2012	Saudi Arabia	Riyadh	26	135	2012 Riyadh truck crash
31 January 2013	Mexico	Mexico City	37	126	Torre Ejecutiva Pemex explosion
17 April 2013	United States	West	15	160 / 200	West Fertilizer Company explosion
29 April 2013	Czech Republic	Prague	0	43	2013 Prague explosion
7 May 2013	Mexico	Ecatepec de Morelos	27	36	2013 Ecatepec de Morelos gas tanker explosion
25 May 2013	Pakistan	Gujrat, Punjab	17	7	Explosion inside a school bus caused by a gas cylinder.
31 May 2013	Philippines	Taguig	3	5	2013 Serendra explosion
13 June 2013	United States	Geismar, Louisiana	2	114	Williams Olefins Plant explosion
6 July 2013	Canada	Lac-Mégantic	47	1	Lac-Mégantic rail disaster
6 August 2013	Argentina	Rosario	22	60	2013 Rosario gas explosion
12 October 2013	Vietnam	Phong Châu, Phú Thọ	24	100+	Firework factory explosion.
22 November 2013	China	Qingdao	62	Unknown	2013 Qingdao oil pipeline explosion
10 December 2013	Egypt	Gharbia Governorate	13	6	Kafr Elle Zayat fuel truck explosion
9 January 2014	Japan	Yokkaichi, Mie Prefecture	5	17	Mitsubishi Materials chemical plant explosion
7 January 2014	Nigeria	Apapa	15	Unknown	Kirikiri tanker explosion
27 February 2014	Qatar	Doha	12	30+	Suspected gas explosion at a Turkish restaurant.
12 March 2014	United States	New York City	8	70	2014 East Harlem gas explosion
13 May 2014	Turkey	Soma	301	80	Soma mine disaster
27 June 2014	India	Nagaram	22	30	2014 GAIL pipeline explosion
28 June 2014	India	Alang, Gujarat	5	6	Explosion at a ship breaking yard.
31 July 2014	Taiwan	Kaohsiung	32	321	2014 Kaohsiung gas explosions
2 August 2014	China	Kunshan	146	114	2014 Kunshan explosion
31 August 2014	France	Rosny-sous-Bois	6	0	Explosion in an apartment building.
1 October 2014	Bulgaria	Gorni Lom	15	3	2014 Gorni Lom explosions
22 November 2014	Malaysia	Sarawak	4	30	2014 Selantik coal mine explosion
4 March 2015	Ukraine	Donetsk	34	14	2015 Zasyadko mine disaster
26 March 2015	United States	New York City	2	19	2015 East Village gas explosion
4 June 2015	Ghana	Accra	256	Unknown	2015 Accra explosion
27 June 2015	Taiwan	New Taipei City	15	497	Formosa Fun Coast explosion
3 July 2015	South Korea	Ulsan	6	0	Explosion at a chemical plant.
24 July 2015	Italy	Modugno	7	Unknown	A large explosion which triggered other explosions and a fire at a fireworks factory.
12 August 2015	China	Tianjin	173	801	2015 Tianjin explosions – Occurred at a hazardous goods warehouse operated by Ruihai Logistics.
25 August 2015	Afghanistan	Herat	11	18	Gas explosion.
31 August 2015	China	Dongying, Shandong province	13	25	A chemical plant owned by the Shandong Binyuan Chemical Company exploded.
12 September 2015	India	Petlawad	105	150	Petlawad explosion
13 September 2015	Pakistan	Multan	11	79	
15 January 2016	China	Tongxu County, Henan Province	10	7	An illegal fireworks plant exploded.
16 January 2016	Italy	Arnasco	5	1	Suspected gas explosion.
25 February 2016	Russia	Vorkuta	36	9	Vorkuta mine disaster
10 April 2016	India	Paravur	111	350+	Puttingal temple fire
20 April 2016	Mexico	Coatzacoalcos	24	136	Explosion at the major Clorados 3 petrochemical plant of Petroquimica Mexicana de Vinilo.
19 March 2016	Vietnam	Hà Đông, Hanoi	6	8	Illegal bomb recycling.
4 May 2016	Ukraine (Luhansk People's Republic)	Luhansk	10	4	Coal mine explosion.
28 June 2016	Canada	Mississauga	2	13	A huge explosion completely destroyed a house and damaged 24 others. Thousands of residents were evacuated. Police later concluded the incident was a double suicide.
11 August 2016	United States	Silver Spring, Maryland	7	68	Gas explosion at the Flower Branch Apartments. The blast displaced more than 90 residents. The NTSB found that the blast was caused by failure of an indoor mercury service regulator with an unconnected vent line that allowed natural gas into the meter room where it accumulated and ignited from an unknown ignition source.
11 August 2016	China	Dangyang, Hubei Province	22	4	2016 Dangyang explosion – Explosion caused by a high-pressure steam pipe at a power plant.
10 September 2016	Bangladesh	Tongi	25	70	A boiler exploded, causing a fire in a factory.
11 September 2016	Benin	Tori	8	0	
1 November 2016	Pakistan	Gadani, Balochistan Province	14	59	Gas cylinder explosion aboard an oil tanker that caused a major fire at a ship-breaking yard.
17 November 2016	Mozambique	Caphiridzange, Tete Province	80	Unknown	Caphiridzange explosion – Fuel tanker explosion.
10 December 2016	Bulgaria	Hitrino	7	29	Hitrino train derailment – Explosion caused by the derailment of a train carrying propane and butane.
11 December 2016	Kenya	Nakuru County	43	50+	2016 Naivasha Traffic Fireball – An oil tanker exploded on a main highway near Naivasha.
20 December 2016	Mexico	Tultepec	42	84	2016 San Pablito Market fireworks explosion – Explosion at a fireworks market.
23 February 2017	Pakistan	Lahore	10	31	2017 Lahore explosion
5 June 2017	China	Linyi, Shandong	8	9	An explosion at a chemical plant.
25 June 2017	China	Dafang County	12	12	Qishanyan Tunnel explosion
25 June 2017	Pakistan	Bahawalpur	219	34	2017 Bahawalpur explosion
1 September 2017	United States	Crosby, Texas	0	Unknown	2017 Arkema plant explosion
26 September 2017	Ukraine	Kalynivka	0	Unknown	2017 Kalynivka ammunition depot explosion
7 October 2017	Ghana	Accra	7+	192+	Atomic Junction Gas Explosion
26 October 2017	Indonesia	Tangerang	49	46	Tangerang fireworks disaster
1 November 2017	India	Unchahar	38	90+	NTPC power plant explosion
20 November 2017	United States	New Windsor, New York	1	100+	Explosion from hexamethyldisiloxane reaction subsequently ignited at the New Windsor Verla International Cosmetics plant, a manufacturing plant specializing in nail polish.
25 February 2018	United Kingdom	Leicester	5	5	2018 Leicester explosion
22 March 2018	Czech Republic	Kralupy nad Vltavou	6	2	Explosion at a chemical factory.
27 June 2018	Nigeria	Lagos–Ibadan Expressway	12+	Unknown	Otedola bridge fire accident – Explosion after an oil tanker fell on a bridge, burning 55 cars.
6 August 2018	Italy	Bologna	2	145	2018 Borgo Panigale explosion – An LPG tanker exploded on the A14 motorway after colliding with a car carrier and another semi-trailer truck near Bologna Airport, causing a section of the motorway to collapse.
12 August 2018	Syria	Sarmada, Idlib Governorate	67	33	Explosion at an arms depot.
3 September 2018	South Africa	Cape Town	8	0	Explosion at a Rheinmetall munition depot.
10 September 2018	Nigeria	Lafia	35	100+	A gas depot exploded.
13 September 2018	United States	Merrimack Valley, Massachusetts	1	25+	Merrimack Valley gas explosions
6 October 2018	Democratic Republic of the Congo	Kongo Central	39–50	100+	Mbuba road tanker explosion
13 October 2018	Nigeria	Aba	30	Unknown	Pipeline explosion. Oil thieves were suspected be the cause.
16 November 2018	Zimbabwe	Beitbridge	42	20	Explosion of a gas cylinder on a bus.
5 December 2018	Dominican Republic	Santo Domingo	8	103	A fire and explosion at a factory owned by Polyplas destroyed a warehouse and multiple houses and vehicles around it.
31 December 2018	Russia	Magnitogorsk	39	17	2018 Magnitogorsk building collapse
12 January 2019	France	Paris	4	47	2019 Paris explosion
18 January 2019	Mexico	Hidalgo	135	52	2019 Tlahuelilpan pipeline explosion
21 January 2019	Pakistan	Hub, Balochistan	26	16	2019 Hub accident
20 February 2019	Bangladesh	Dhaka	80	50+	February 2019 Dhaka fire
27 February 2019	Egypt	Cairo	25	50	Ramses Station rail disaster
21 March 2019	China	Yancheng	78	617	2019 Xiangshui chemical plant explosion
10 April 2019	United States	Durham, North Carolina	2	25	2019 Durham gas explosion
25 April 2019	Ukraine (Luhansk People's Republic)	Lutuhyne	17–19	Unknown	An explosion ripped through a mine owned by 'Skhidcarbon', located in separatist-controlled territory.
22 June 2019	Nigeria	Oyigbo	12	Unknown	Pipeline explosion.
2 July 2019	Nigeria	Benue State	50+	101	A fuel tanker exploded after overturning.
10 August 2019	Tanzania	Morogoro	89	55	Morogoro tanker explosion
4 September 2019	India	Gurdaspur	23	13	Explosion at a fireworks factory.
20 November 2019	Italy	Messina, Sicily	5	2	An explosion occurred at a fireworks factory due to an interaction between welding equipment and gunpowder.
3 December 2019	Sudan	Khartoum	23	45	A tanker exploded at a factory.
4 December 2019	Poland	Szczyrk	8	0	An explosion caused the collapse of a building.
5 December 2019	Nigeria	Lagos	7	Unknown	An explosion caused by oil thieves.
6 December 2019	Slovakia	Prešov	7	Unknown	Gas explosion at an apartment.

== 2020s ==
Date	Country	Location	Dead	Injured	Details
14 January 2020	Spain	Tarragona	3	7	Chemical Industries of Ethylene Oxide explosion – Two explosions and a fire in a petrochemical complex.
23 January 2020	Peru	Villa El Salvador	34	28	2020 Villa El Salvador explosion – A fuel truck transporting liquefied petroleum gas exploded, affecting at least 20 homes.
24 January 2020	United States	Houston	2	18	2020 Houston explosion – A manufacturing plant explosion scattered rubble and debris for a half-mile.
15 March 2020	Nigeria	Lagos	23	Unknown	Abule-Ado explosion – A gas pipeline exploded after being hit by truck, destroying over 100 homes and dozens of vehicles.
29 April 2020	South Korea	Icheon	38	10+	2020 Icheon fire – Warehouse explosion.
3 June 2020	India	Gujarat	10	77	2020 Dahej chemical plant explosion
8 June 2020	Nigeria	Niger Delta	7	Unknown	An explosion at an oil facility of the state-run NNPC company.
14 June 2020	China	Wenling	19	170+	A fuel tanker crashed and exploded. Several buildings were severely damaged.
21 June 2020	Ukraine	Kyiv	5	5	Gas explosion in a residential building. The explosion was caused by negligence during verification of gas counters.
30 June 2020	Iran	Tehran	19	6+	2020 Iran explosions – A gas explosion severely damaged the Sina At'har health center.
6 July 2020	Colombia	Pueblo Viejo	45	19	Tasajera explosion – A gas truck exploded after it overturned.
30 July 2020	Japan	Kōriyama, Fukushima Prefecture	1	19	Kōriyama explosion
3 August 2020	North Korea	Hyesan	15	Unknown	A gas explosion burned several homes and caused at least 10 other explosions.
4 August 2020	Lebanon	Beirut	218	7,500	2020 Beirut explosion – An explosion damaged the port of Beirut, causing $15+ billion in damage and displacing 300,000 people.
4 August 2020	China	Xiantao, Hubei province	6	4	Explosion at an organic silicon workshop.
10 August 2020	Russia	Volgograd	0	13	2020 Volgograd explosion – Explosion at a gas station caused by a fire.
21 August 2020	United States	Corpus Christi, Texas	5	5	A propane pipeline explosion in the Port of Corpus Christi sank a dredging vessel killing five of its crew.
4 September 2020	Bangladesh	Fatullah, Narayanganj district	31	40	2020 Narayanganj explosion – Explosion at a mosque due to leakage of a Titas Gas pipeline.
23 September 2020	Nigeria	Kogi State	28+	Unknown	Explosion of an oil tanker that also set two motorcycles, five cars, and three tricycles on fire.
28 September 2020	China	Tianmen	5	1	Explosion during the testing of new equipment at a chemical plant in Yuekou Industrial park.
8 October 2020	Nigeria	Lagos	8	Unknown	An explosion at a gas station burned down 25 homes and 16 shops.
11 October 2020	Iran	Ahvaz, Khuzestan Province	5	9	Gas explosion.
12 October 2020	Nigeria	Oriade	9	Unknown	A tanker fell over and exploded along the Ilesa-Akure highway.
21 October 2020	Pakistan	Karachi	5+	27	Explosion at an apartment building.
4 November 2020	India	Ahmedabad	12	9	2020 Ahmedabad chemical factory blast
16 November 2020	Mexico	Nayarit	14	0	Gas pipeline explosion on a busy highway. The explosion occurred when a car collided with the gas-pipe.
19 November 2020	India	West Bengal	5	4	Explosion at a recycling plant.
3 December 2020	United Kingdom	Bristol	4	1	Avonmouth explosion – Explosion at a silo holding treated biosolids at a wastewater treatment plant.
19 December 2020	Turkey	Gaziantep	12	50	Gaziantep hospital fire – An oxygen ventilator exploded in an intensive care unit of the Sanko University Hospital.
23 December 2020	Pakistan	New Karachi Town	10	28	A boiler exploded in an ice factory. The explosion destroyed the factory and severely damaged two nearby factories.
23 December 2020	Nigeria	Jebba	16	Unknown	A fuel tanker exploded after hitting a building. The explosion destroyed 30 homes.
2 January 2021	Afghanistan	Kabul	5	Unknown	A gas cylinder exploded near a bakery.
10 January 2021	China	Qixia	10	11	Qixia gold mine accident
20 January 2021	Spain	Madrid	4	10	2021 Madrid explosion – A gas explosion severely damaged a building.
21 January 2021	India	Shivamogga	8	Unknown	A truck loaded with blasting gelatin exploded.
27 January 2021	Cameroon	Dschang	53	29	Dschang bus-truck crash – A bus collided with a truck carrying fuel causing an explosion.
12 February 2021	India	Virudhunagar district, Tamil Nadu	19	30	Explosion at a fireworks factory.
13 February 2021	Afghanistan	Herat Province	40	17	An explosion of oil tankers at the Islam-Qala customs post that damaged or destroyed more than 500 oil tankers.
13 February 2021	Afghanistan	Balkh Province	30	Unknown	An explosion occurred at a Taliban bomb-making class. Thirty militants (including six foreigners) were killed, and an unknown number were injured.
23 February 2021	India	Chikkaballapur, Karnataka	6	Unknown	A truck loaded with blasting gelatin exploded.
24 February 2021	Afghanistan	Uruzgan Province	10	0	An explosion of a minivan's engine caused a fire.
7 March 2021	Equatorial Guinea	Bata	107+	615+	2021 Bata explosions – Four explosions at a military base.
12 March 2021	Pakistan	Marwar, Balochistan	6	2	Natural gas explosion in a coal mine.
14 March 2021	Tunisia	Gabès	6	1	Tanker explosion at an asphalt plant.
28 March 2021	Indonesia	Indramayu, West Java	1	20	2021 Balongan refinery explosion – The Pertamina-owned Balongan oil refinery (RU VI) suffered an explosion and caught fire.
7 April 2021	China	Chuzhou, Anhui	6	5	Flash explosion at a power plant.
9 April 2021	China	Hebei province	10	Unknown, 7 trapped	Mining accident.
19 April 2021	Nigeria	Agatu, Benue State	12	Unknown	A gas tanker truck leaked and exploded, destroying shops and homes.
24 April 2021	Iraq	Baghdad	82	110	Baghdad hospital fire – An oxygen tank at Ibn al-Khatib hospital exploded, starting a fire.
2 May 2021	Afghanistan	Kabul	7	14	Dozens of oil tankers caught on fire then exploded.
13 June 2021	China	Checheng Road Subdistrict	25	138	2021 Shiyan pipeline explosion – A gas pipeline blew up underneath a vegetable market.
14 June 2021	United States	Rockton, Illinois	0	2	2021 Rockton fire – A massive chemical explosion was reported at the Chemtool chemical plant caused by a scissor lift accident (a replacement of insulation on an elevated heat transfer piping network) which ended up striking a piece of piping with sufficient mechanical force causing the release of mineral oil. At least 70 people were evacuated. A mandatory evacuation was later ordered, while witnesses from 75 miles away saw smoke across portions of northern Illinois and southern Wisconsin.
19 June 2021	United States	Fort Deposit, Alabama	10	Unknown	A van collided with a S.U.V. causing the van to explode, setting fire to other cars. This incident occurred due to Tropical Storm Claudette.
27 June 2021	Bangladesh	Maghbazar, Dhaka	11	100+	2021 Moghbazar explosion – Gas explosion at a three-story building.
17 July 2021	Kenya	between Kisumu and Busia	13	24	A tanker truck exploded after hitting another car.
27 July 2021	Germany	Leverkusen	7	31	2021 Leverkusen explosion – An explosion occurred at Chempark, an industrial park for chemical factories.
2 August 2021	Democratic Republic of the Congo	Kibuba	33	Unknown	A bus crashed with a tank truck, causing an explosion.
13 August 2021	Russia	Voronezh	2	22	Voronezh Bus Explosion.
14 August 2021	Lebanon	Akkar District	28	70	2021 Akkar explosion – Fuel tanker explosion.
23 August 2021	Kazakhstan	Jambyl Region	13	98	Explosion at a military base.
25 August 2021	Colombia	Boyacá Department	12	1	Dust explosion at a mine.
8 September 2021	Russia	Noginsk	7	19	Apartment explosion.
20 September 2021	Canada	Beauceville, Quebec	6	5	Explosion at a lumber plant.
22 October 2021	Russia	Lesnoy, Ryazan Oblast	17	0	Explosion at a gunpowder factory.
25 October 2021	Nigeria	Yenagoa, Nigeria	25+	Unknown	Explosion at an illegal refinery.
5 November 2021	Sierra Leone	Freetown	151	304	Freetown fuel tanker explosion
7 November 2021	Kazakhstan	Abay District, Karaganda Region	6	2	Methane gas explosion at a mine.
18 November 2021	Nigeria	Ogere Remo	5	Unknown	A petrol tanker exploded along the Lagos-Ibadan Expressway.
25 November 2021	Russia	Kemerovo Oblast, Russia	51	76	Listvyazhnaya mine disaster – Coal mine explosion.
11 December 2021	Italy	Ravanusa, Sicily	9	2	2021 Ravanusa explosion – 100 were displaced due to a gas explosion in an apartment.
14 December 2021	Haiti	Cap-Haïtien	90+	120+	Cap-Haïtien fuel tanker explosion – Fuel tanker explosion.
18 December 2021	Pakistan	Karachi	14	Unknown	Explosion at a bank suspected to have been caused by a gas leak in a sewer.
26 December 2021	India	Muzaffarpur	6	6	Factory boiler explosion.
7 January 2022	China	Chongqing, Yuzhong District	16	10	Chongqing explosion – Gas explosion in a housing block which contained a canteen.
13 January 2022	Canada	Southern Ottawa, Ontario	6	2	Explosion and fire on Block 1900, Merivale Road, at Eastway Tank, Pump and Meter Ltd.
20 January 2022	Ghana	Apeatse	13	59	2022 Bogoso explosion – A truck carrying mining explosives collided with a motorcycle, destroying much of the village.
14 February 2022	France	Saint-Laurent-de-la-Salanque	8	30	Saint-Laurent-de-la-Salanque explosion – a multi-family residential building was destroyed in an explosion.
21 February 2022	Burkina Faso	Gbomblora	59	100	Gbomblora explosion – Chemical explosion at a gold mine.
20 April 2022	Poland	Pawłowice, Silesia	16	30	Mining disaster in the Pniówek mine
23 April 2022	Poland	Jastrzębie-Zdrój, Silesia	10	3+	Mining Disaster in the Zofiówka mine
22 April 2022	Nigeria	Imo State/Rivers State	100+	Unknown	2022 Imo-Rivers explosion – An explosion occurred at an illegal bunkering site.
6 May 2022	Cuba	Havana	32	64	Hotel Saratoga explosion – Explosion on the first few floors of the Hotel Saratoga, caused by a suspected gas leak.
17 May 2022	Nigeria	Kano	9	1+	Gas explosion caused by welding.
26 May 2022	United States	Pottstown, Pennsylvania	5	2	House explosion.
4 June 2022	Bangladesh	Sitakunda, Chittagong	49	~450	2022 Sitakunda fire – Fire and subsequent explosions at a container depot.
4 June 2022	India	Hapur, Uttar Pradesh	13	20	Hapur chemical plant explosion
14 August 2022	Armenia	Yerevan	16	61	2022 Yerevan explosion – Explosion at a fireworks warehouse in a shopping mall.
7 October 2022	Ireland	Creeslough, County Donegal	10	8	Creeslough explosion – Explosion at a petrol station.
9 December 2022	Indonesia	Sawahlunto, West Sumatra	10	4	Explosion at a coal mine.
10 December 2022	Jersey	St Helier	10	2	2022 St Helier explosion – Suspected gas explosion in a block of flats that led to the building's collapse.
16 December 2022	Germany	Berlin	0	2	AquaDom explosion – A 14 m (46 ft) tall aquarium containing 1 million litres of water in the Radisson Blu Hotel exploded, throwing huge amounts of water and hundreds of tropical fish into the hotel and nearby Karl-Liebknecht-Straße.
24 December 2022	South Africa	Boksburg	26	22	Boksburg explosion
20 February 2023	United States	Bedford, Ohio	1	13	2023 Bedford explosion
4 March 2023	Bangladesh	Sitakunda, Chittagong	7	17	A fire at an oxygen plant led to an explosion.
7 March 2023	Bangladesh	Gulistan, Dhaka	24	140	2023 Dhaka Siddique Bazar explosion
14 March 2023	Colombia	Sutatausa, Cundinamarca Department	21		Coal mine explosion.
24 March 2023	United States	West Reading, Pennsylvania	7	10	2023 Pennsylvania chocolate factory explosion
10 April 2023	United States	Dimmitt, Texas	0	1	2023 Texas dairy farm explosion: More than 18,000 cows died in an explosion at the South Fork Dairy.
24 April 2023	Pakistan	Kabal Tehsil, Khyber Pakhtunkhwa	17	50+	2023 Kabal explosions: Explosions at a Counter Terrorism Department building due to a fire in the basement, where explosives were being kept.
21 June 2023	China	Yinchuan	31	7	2023 Yinchuan gas explosion: Gas explosion at a barbecue restaurant.
21 June 2023	France	Paris	1	50	Explosion at the Paris American Academy fashion school
30 July 2023	Thailand	Mu No, Narathiwat Province	12	121	Explosion at a fireworks warehouse believed to have been caused by a welding error.
12 August 2023	United States	Plum, Pennsylvania	6	60	House explosion that destroyed three structures while damaging multiple others.
14 August 2023	Dominican Republic	San Cristóbal	32	59	Explosion at a commercial district that destroyed four buildings and damaged nine others.
15 August 2023	Russia	Makhachkala, Dagestan	35	115	2023 Makhachkala gas station explosion: A petrol station exploded following a fire that started at an opposite car park.
23 September 2023	Benin	Seme-Podji	35	12+	A warehouse for smuggled fuel from Nigeria caught fire and exploded.
25 September 2023	Nagorno-Karabakh	Berkadzor	218	290+	Nagorno-Karabakh fuel depot explosion: A fuel storage facility exploded while refugees from the 2023 Nagorno-Karabakh clashes were lining up to obtain fuel for their vehicles to use in fleeing to Armenia.
28 September 2023	Uzbekistan	Tashkent	1	162	Tashkent explosion: A warehouse near the airport in the Sergeli district exploded.
2 October 2023	Nigeria	Emohua, Rivers State	18-37	25	An illegal homemade refinery ignited a nearby oil reservoir.
30 November 2023	Russia	Rostov Oblast	12	8	Accidental explosion possibly caused by a misfire of a RPG-7 grenade launcher at the Kuzmin military training ground just after their lunch break.
18 December 2023	Guinea	Kaloum, Conakry	24	454	Conakry oil depot explosion: Explosion at an oil terminal.
24 December 2023	Indonesia	Morowali Regency, Central Sulawesi	18	44	Explosion at the furnace of a nickel processing plant inside the Morowali Industrial Park.
26 December 2023	Liberia	Totota	40	83	A fuel truck crashed and exploded while residents were collecting spilled fuel.
17 January 2024	Thailand	Sala Khao, Mueang Suphan Buri district, Suphan Buri province	23	0	Suphan Buri fireworks explosion
24 January 2024	Mongolia	Ulaanbaatar	7	14	A gas leak caused a white gas cloud to spread through the streets, leading to multiple explosions.
6 February 2024	India	Bairagarh, Madhya Pradesh	11	100+	Explosion at a fireworks factory.
17 February 2024	India	Virudhunagar, Tamil Nadu	10	7	2024 Virudhunagar explosions: Explosion at a fireworks factory.
11 March 2024	China	Anhui	7	24	Explosion at the Xieqiao coal mine.
13 March 2024	China	Yanjiao, Hebei	7	27	Explosion at a fried chicken shop.
27 April 2024	Cambodia	Kampong Speu province	20	Several	2024 Kampong Speu ammunition depot explosion: Ammunition exploded at a military base.
23 May 2024	Tanzania	Morogoro Region	11	2	Explosion at the Mtibwa Sugar Factory caused by an electrical fault at a steam pipe.
23 May 2024	India	Dombivli, Maharashtra	10	64	2024 Thane explosion: Explosion of four boilers caused a fire in a chemical factory.
28 May 2024	United States	Youngstown, Ohio	1	7+	Realty Building explosion: A suspected gas explosion mostly destroyed the first floor of the Realty Tower, causing it to later be demolished.
18 June 2024	Chad	N'Djamena	9	46+	N'Djamena ammunition depot explosions
29 June 2024	Philippines	Zamboanga City	5	38	Explosion at a firecracker warehouse.
30 June 2024	Turkey	İzmir	5	63	Explosion of a propane tank inside a restaurant.
23 July 2024	Mexico	Tequila, Jalisco	6	2	Explosion inside a tequila factory owned by Jose Cuervo.
1 August 2024	Russia	Nizhny Tagil, Sverdlovsk Oblast	10	15	A gas explosion caused an apartment block to collapse.
21 August 2024	India	Anakapalli district, Andhra Pradesh	18	41	Atchutapuram pharmaceutical factory explosion
8 September 2024	Nigeria	Agaie, Niger State	52	Unknown	Explosion caused by a collision between a fuel truck and a truck carrying cattle that also affected two other vehicles.
14 September 2024	Haiti	Miragoane	26	40	A fuel truck overturned before exploding as bystanders tried to collect gasoline.
27 September 2024	Russia	Makhachkala, Dagestan	13	23	A petrol station exploded.
12 October 2024	Russia	Grozny, Chechnya	4	5	A petrol station exploded.
15 October 2024	Nigeria	Majiya, Jigawa State	209	124	2024 Majiya fuel tanker explosion: An overturned fuel truck exploded while bystanders were trying to collect its cargo.
22 October 2024	Uganda	Kigogwa	11	Unknown	An overturned fuel truck exploded while bystanders were trying to collect its cargo. Four buildings were also destroyed.
30 October 2024	Mexico	Xaloztoc, Tlaxcala State	12	1	Explosion and fire caused by molten steel interacting with water at a steel factory.
31 October 2024	Russia	Cherkessk, Karachay-Cherkessia	5	4	Gas explosion at a residential building.
12 November 2024	United States	Louisville, Kentucky	2	12	Louisville factory explosion: Explosion caused by hazardous materials in a commercial workplace building.
4 December 2024	Vietnam	Đồng Nai province	12		A lightning strike triggered the detonators that were being transported by a group of soldiers.
7 December 2024	Netherlands	The Hague	6	5	An explosion destroyed an apartment block.
9 December 2024	Italy	Calenzano, Tuscany	4	14	An explosion at an Eni fuel depot caused an office building to collapse.
24 December 2024	Turkey	Karesi, Balıkesir	11	7	Explosion at a factory producing explosives.
1 January 2025	United States	Honolulu	6	26	A cake bomb exploded inside of a house.
7 January 2025	Cuba	Melones, Holguín Province	13	Unknown	Explosion at an ammunition depot that killed soldiers and displaced 1,200 residents.
11 January 2025	Yemen	Az Zahir District, Al Bayda Governorate	40	74	Al-Bayda gas station explosion
11 January 2025	Czech Republic	Most	7	7	Most restaurant explosion
18 January 2025	Nigeria	Suleja, Niger State	98	69	2025 Suleja fuel tanker explosion: Explosion during the transfer of fuel from a crashed truck to another using a generator.
24 January 2025	India	Bhandara district, Maharashtra	8	7	Explosion at an ordnance factory.
25 January 2025	Nigeria	Enugu State	18	10	A fuel tanker crashed into 17 vehicles along the Enugu-Onitsha expressway and exploded.
27 January 2025	Pakistan	Multan	18	11	A truck carrying liquefied petroleum gas caught fire and exploded near an industrial area.
13 February 2025	Taiwan	Taichung	4	40	2025 Taichung Shin Kong Mitsukoshi gas explosion: Explosion at a Shin Kong Mitsukoshi department store
17 February 2025	Egypt	Kerdasa	10	8	2025 Kerdasa building collapse: A gas explosion caused a building to collapse.
20 February 2025	Syria	Al-Nayrab	7		Explosion of unexploded ordnance at a house owned by a scrap dealer.
15 March 2025	Syria	Latakia	16	14	Explosion caused by the mishandling of unexploded ordnance by a scrap dealer at a residential building.
31 March 2025	Spain	Degaña, Asturias	5	4	Explosion at the Cerredo mine.
31 March 2025	India	Patharpratima, West Bengal	8		Explosion caused by a gas cylinder at a house that doubled as an illegal firecracker factory. The deceased were members of the same family.
1 April 2025	India	Deesa, Gujarat	21	5	2025 Gujarat factory fire: Explosion at an illegal fireworks factory.
16 April 2025	Peru	Lurín	0	16	Two unlicensed liquefied petroleum gas tanks caught on fire, causing a blast that damaged the Fundo San Vicente area.
26 April 2025	Iran	Bandar Abbas	57	1,000+	Port of Shahid Rajaee explosion
12 May 2025	Indonesia	Garut Regency, West Java	13	Several	Explosion during the disposal of unusable and expired ammunition by soldiers at an environmental conservation area.
27 May 2025	China	Weifang, Shandong	5	19	Explosion at a chemical plant.
16 June 2025	China	Linli County, Hunan	9	26	Explosion at a firecracker factory.
30 June 2025	India	Sangareddy, Telangana	46	33	Telangana chemical factory explosion
1 July 2025	United States	Esparto, California	7	2	Esparto, California fireworks explosion: Explosion at a warehouse storing fireworks, leading to multiple structures and 80 acres (32 ha) of grassland catching fire.
8 July 2025	India	Virudhunagar, Tamil Nadu	10	Several	Explosion at a fireworks factory.
18 July 2025	United States	Los Angeles, California	3		Explosion at a Los Angeles County Sheriff's Department training facility.
24 July 2025	Syria	Maarrat Misrin	12	157	Explosion at an ammunition dump.
25 July 2025	Russia	Saratov	7	16	Gas explosion at an apartment building.
29 July 2025	United States	Fremont, Nebraska	3		Explosion at a biofuel plant.
30 July 2025	Thailand	Mueang District, Suphan Buri province	9	2	An unlicensed fireworks factory explodes, killing nine, leaving another injured, and also destroyed a nearby car and two wooden houses.
9 August 2025	Lebanon	Zibqin	6	Several	Explosion during dismantling by the Lebanese Army of munitions at a suspected Hezbollah weapons depot.
12 August 2025	Brazil	Curitiba	9	7	Explosion at an explosives factory.
15 August 2025	Russia	Lesnoy, Ryazan Oblast	28	157	2025 Lesnoy factory explosion: Explosion at an explosives factory.
9 September 2025	Afghanistan	Bala Buluk District, Farah Province	7		Seven members of a single family were killed in the detonation of explosives stockpiled inside their residence.
10 September 2025	Mexico	Iztapalapa, Mexico City	31	90	2025 Iztapalapa tank truck explosion: A propane truck overturned and exploded under a highway overpass.
14 September 2025	Spain	Madrid	2	25	An explosion occurred at the Mis Tesoros bar and an adjacent premises in Puente de Vallecas (Madrid).
22 September 2025	Pakistan	Tirah, Khyber Pakhtunkhwa	24		Fourteen militants and 10 civilians died after bomb-making equipment at a compound operated by the Pakistani Taliban exploded.
10 October 2025	United States	McEwen/Hurricane Mills, Tennessee	16	4+	2025 Tennessee manufacturing plant explosion.
15 October 2025	Indonesia	Tanjung Uncang, Batam	10	21	Explosion following a fire originating from the fuel tank of a crude palm oil tanker at a shipyard during repair works.
17 October 2025	Romania	Bucharest	3	14	2025 Rahova gas explosion: Explosion at an apartment building.
17 October 2025	Russia	Sterlitamak, Bashkortostan	3	5	Explosion at an explosives factory.
21 October 2025	Nigeria	Bida, Niger State	31	17	An overturned fuel truck exploded while residents tried to collect its contents.
22 October 2025	Russia	Kopeysk, Chelyabinsk Oblast	23		2025 Plastmass Factory explosion.
1 November 2025	Mexico	Hermosillo, Sonora	24	12	2025 Hermosillo convenience store fire: Explosion and fire at a convenience store.
14 November 2025	Argentina	Carlos Spegazzini, Buenos Aires Province	0	25	Explosion and fire at an industrial park.
14 November 2025	India	Nowgam, Jammu and Kashmir	9	32	Explosion inside a police station.
15 November 2025	Pakistan	Latifabad, Sindh	7	Several	Explosion at a fireworks factory.
21 November 2025	Pakistan	Faisalabad, Punjab	18	21	Explosion at a glue factory.
26 November 2025	Syria	Kafr Takharim, Idlib Governorate	5	9	Explosion at an arms depot.
12 December 2025	Cameroon	Likomba, Southwest Region	8		A fuel tanker exploded after the driver lost control and crashed into several cars and buildings.
23 December 2025	United States	Bristol Township, Pennsylvania	2	20	Explosion and fire at a nursing home.
2 January 2026	Latvia	Riga	2	3	A gas explosion damaged part of a residential building in Tornakalns.
9 January 2026	Spain	Madrid	1	10	A gas explosion damaged a building.
11 January 2026	Pakistan	Islamabad	8	7	A gas cylinder exploded inside a house during a wedding.
18 January 2026	China	Baotou, Inner Mongolia	4	84	A pressurized storage tank exploded at the Baogang United Steel factory.
22 January 2026	India	Baloda Bazar-Bhatapara district, Chhattisgarh	6	5	Explosion at a steel factory.
5 February 2026	India	East Jaintia Hills district, Meghalaya	18	8	Explosion at an illegal coal mine.
7 February 2026	China	Shuoyang, Shanxi	8		Explosion at a biotechnology facility.
17 February 2026	Russia	Sertolovo, Leningrad Oblast	3		Explosion at a military police building.
18 February 2026	Nigeria	Bashar, Plateau State	38	27	Gas explosion at a pit in the Kampanin Zurak lead mining site.
18 February 2026	China	Xiangyang, Hubei	12		Explosion at a fireworks store.
19 February 2026	Chile	Renca, Santiago Province	13	8	A truck that was transporting liquid gas exploded after crashing into a traffic barrier.
27 February 2026	Kazakhstan	Shchuchinsk, Akmola Region	7	19	Explosion and fire at a café.
28 February 2026	India	Kakinada district, Andhra Pradesh	21		2026 Andhra Pradesh fireworks explosion: Explosion at a fireworks factory.
1 March 2026	India	Nagpur district, Maharashtra	18	20	Explosion at an explosives factory.
30 March 2026	China	Wanzhou, Chongqing	4	9	Explosion at an under construction tunnel.
31 March 2026	Russia	Nizhnekamsk, Tatarstan	3	68	Fire and explosion at the Nizhnekamskneftekhim petrochemical plant.
31 March 2026	Burundi	Bujumbura	13	57	Explosion at an ammunition dump.
14 April 2026	India	Sakti district, Chhattisgarh	20	15	Boiler explosion at a Vedanta Limited owned power plant.
16 April 2026	Pakistan	Haripur, Khyber Pakhtunkhwa	8	5	A gas pipeline exploded and set several residential buildings on fire.
19 April 2026	India	Virudhunagar, Tamil Nadu	25	17	Explosion at a fireworks factory.
19 April 2026	United States	Lamar Township, Pennsylvania	7		Explosion and fire at a house.
21 April 2026	India	Thrissur, Kerala	13	40+	Explosion at a fireworks factory.
4 May 2026	China	Liuyang, Hunan	37	51	2026 Liuyang fireworks factory explosion.
5 May 2026	Colombia	Sutatausa	9	6	Explosion in coal mine.
15 May 2026	United States	Portland, Maine	1	11	Explosion and fire at lumber mill.
18 May 2026	Germany	Görlitz, Saxony	3		Explosion at rental and vacation building likely due to gas explosion.
22 May 2026	China	Qinyuan County, Shanxi	82	128	2026 Liushenyu coal mine explosion.
23 May 2026	United States	Staten Island, New York City	1	34+	Explosion at a shipyard.
27 May 2026	United States	Longview, Washington	11	8	2026 Longview, Washington paper mill implosion
28 May 2026	United States	Dallas, Texas	3	5	2026 Dallas apartment explosion.
28 May 2026	United States	Cape Canaveral, Florida	0	0	2026 New Glenn rocket explosion
31 May 2026	Myanmar	Namhkam Township, Shan State	46	74	2026 Namhkam Township explosion
1 June 2026	South Korea	Daejeon, Hoseo	5	2	Explosion and fire at a Hanwha Aerospace facility.
8 June 2026	Uzbekistan	Qashqadaryo Region	6	5	Gas explosion at a filling station.
9 June 2026	Taiwan	Hsinchu	2		Gas explosion at a residential building that affected about eight households and 18 residents.
11 June 2026	China	Xingan, Guangxi	7	17	Gas explosion.
11 June 2026	Yemen	Aden	12	Several	Explosion at a military base run by the Southern Giants Brigades.
21 June 2026	Qatar	Ras Laffan Industrial City, Al Khor	13	66	2026 Ras Laffan explosion.
31 July 2026	Pakistan	Quetta	34		Methane gas explosion at a coal mine.
4 September 2026	Bolivia	Viacha, La Paz Department	9	84	Multiple explosions at a military base.
5 September 2026	Iran	Sanandaj	10	6	Fuel tanker explosion caused by a traffic accident.
5 September 2026	Mexico	Santa María Canchesda, State of Mexico	10	64	Fireworks stored inside a depot exploded during a patronal festival.
9 September 2026	Syria	Sarmada	14	11	Explosion at an arms depot.
18 September 2026	Syria	Ayyash, Deir ez-Zor Governorate	11		Explosion at a military base.
3 October 2026	India	Sri City, Andhra Pradesh	5	1	Explosion at a facility.
29 October 2026	Pakistan	Tharparkar, Sindh	10		An oxygen cylinder exploded inside an ambulance parked at a medical facility.
9 November 2026	Turkey	Aliağa, İzmir Province	18	12	2026 Aliağa factory explosion.

== See also ==
- List of accidents and incidents involving transport or storage of ammunition
- List of ammonium nitrate disasters
- List of boiler explosions
- List of boiling liquid expanding vapor explosions
- List of fireworks accidents and incidents
- List of pipeline accidents
- List of gas explosions
