= 2018 Magnitogorsk building collapse =

2018 apartment building collapse in Magnitogorsk, Chelyabinsk Oblast, Russia

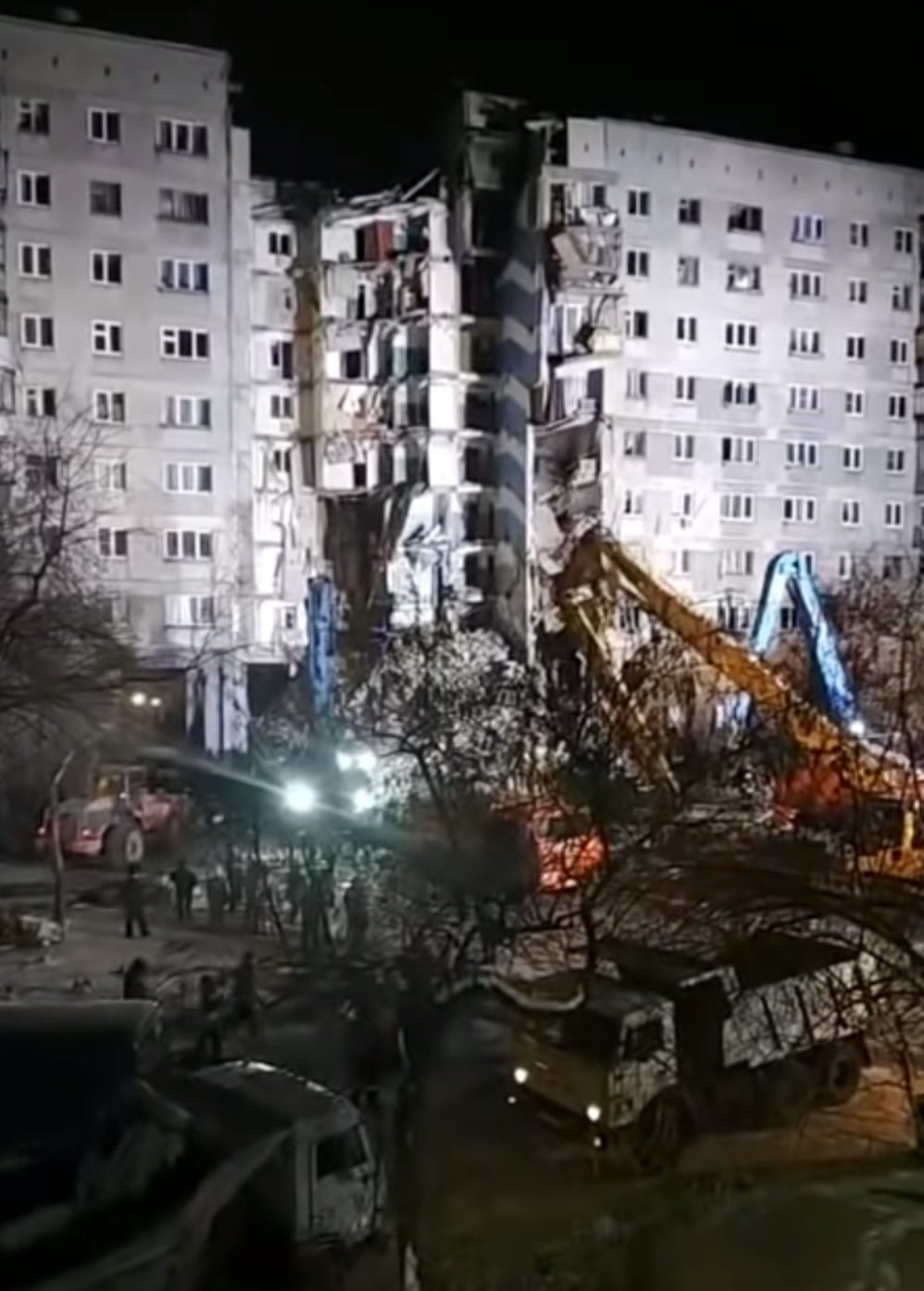
- Date: 31 December 2018
- Time: 6:02 a.m. (Yekaterinburg Time)
- Location: Magnitogorsk, Chelyabinsk Oblast, Russia; 53.3833°N 58.9768°E
- Type: Structural failure
- Cause: Explosion, officially due to a gas leak, alternatively by a bomb
- Motive: Islamic terrorism (alleged, unconfirmed)
- Organised by: Islamic State (claimed responsibility, unconfirmed)
- Deaths: 39
- Injuries: 17 (4 hospitalised and 13 released after first aid treatment)

On 31 December 2018, at approximately 6:02 a.m. local time, an apartment block in Magnitogorsk, Chelyabinsk Oblast, Russia, partially collapsed. The collapse killed 39 people and injured 17 more. The cause of the collapse is believed to have been a gas explosion.

== Background ==
The 10-story high-rise apartment block, located at 164 Prospekt Karla Marksa, built in 1973, holds 623 units, being a type 1-439A building with 12 staircases. The collapse took place on the 7th staircase and destroyed or damaged 48 units which together housed 110 people, of whom 95 were believed to have been in the building at the time of the collapse.

== Cause ==
The collapse is believed to have been caused by a gas explosion. Russian investigators said reports of explosive traces in the rubble were untrue. Based on "unnamed and unverified" sources, the Znak website wrote that the blast came from the second floor where a suspect was keeping explosives to use to attack local businesses.

== Response ==
After the collapse, the building was evacuated. Officials warned that more of the apartment complex was at risk of collapsing.

The daytime temperature at the site was −17 °C (1 °F), and −24 °C (−11 °F) at night. Nearly 1,400 rescue workers helped to free residents from the rubble, and used high-powered heaters to warm people still trapped under the debris.

Russian President Vladimir Putin traveled to the site of the collapse to survey the damage and observe the rescue efforts. He also visited injured residents in the hospital. In a statement he said, "Despite the holiday season, we need to spare a thought for those who perished and those who were injured."

Pittsburgh Penguins forward Evgeni Malkin, a native of the town, paid tribute to the victims of the disaster in the Penguins' game against the New York Rangers on 2 January 2019. His skates bore Russian phrases translating to, "Magnitogorsk, we are with you," and, "Magnitogorsk, you are in my heart." He scored a goal which he dedicated to the town, having hoped prior to the game that he would do so. Following the game, Malkin stated that the team will raise funds for the victims and their families. He donated RU₽4,000,000, the equivalent of almost US$60,000, to a relief fund for the victims, with the rest of the team soon to contribute donations they have collected.

== See also ==
- List of accidents and disasters by death toll
- List of explosions
  - List of 21st-century explosions
- List of structural failures and collapses
- 2012 Astrakhan gas explosion, killed 10 residents of an apartment building.
- Ronan Point
