= Ihuoma =

- Gender: Female
- Language: Igbo

Origin
- Origin: Igbo
- Meaning: Good face
- Region of origin: Igboland

Other names
- Related names: Isioma

Ihuoma is a female Igbo given name, meaning "good face". This is an idiom for luck and favor.

== Notable people with this name ==
- Ihuoma Emenuga, Nigerian-American internist and public health physician
- Linda Ihuoma Ejiofor (born 17 July 1986), Nigerian actress and model
- Ihuoma, the protagonist and titular concubine of Elechi Amadi's The Concubine
