= Medvidka =

Village of Ukraine

Medvidka Медвідка
- Village
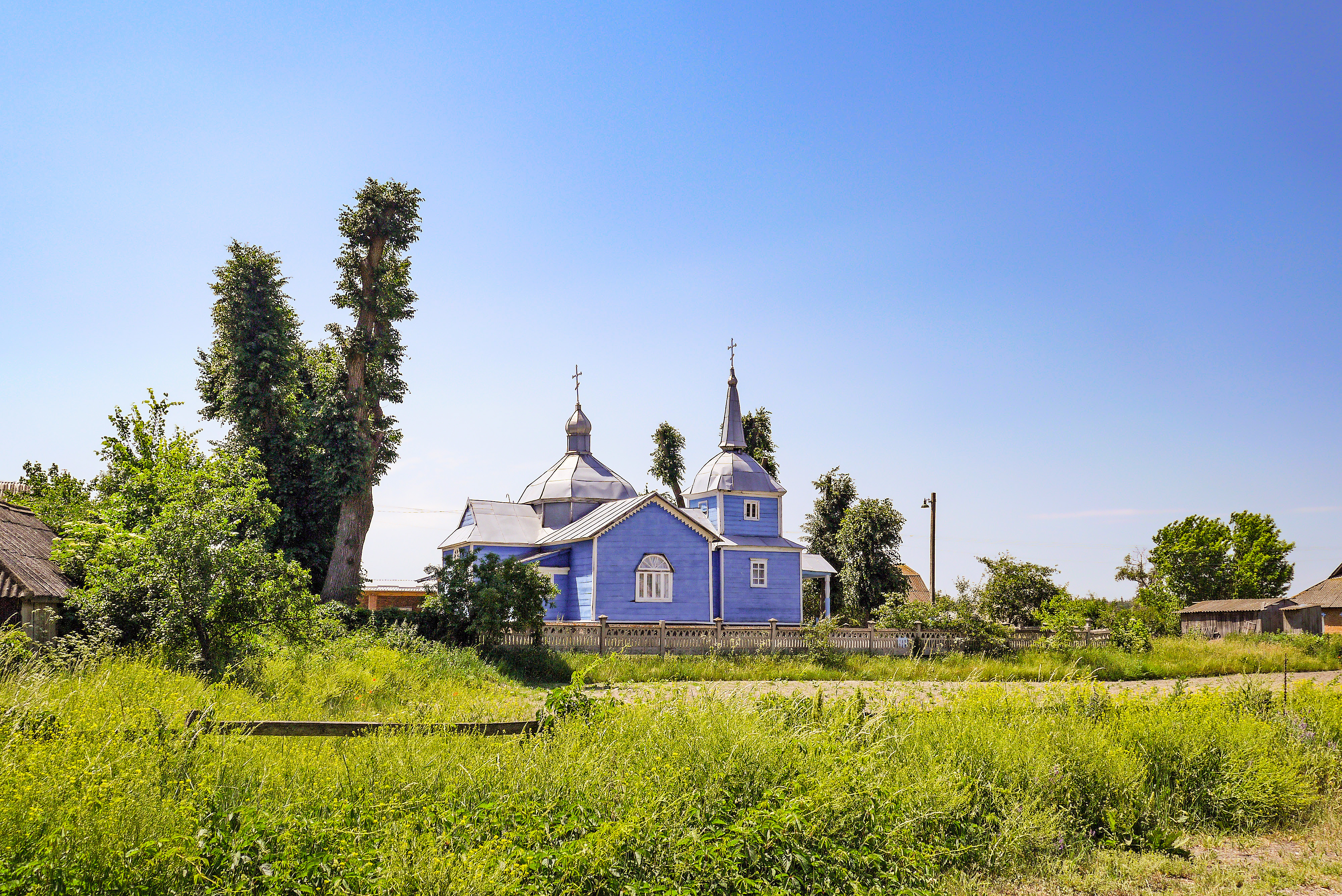
- church of St. Martyr Paraskeva Pyatnitsa
- Interactive map of Medvidka
- Location within Vinnytsia Oblast Location within Ukraine
- Coordinates: 49°22′48″N 28°27′36″E
- Country: Ukraine
- Oblast: Vinnytsia Oblast
- Raion: Vinnytsia Raion
- Hromada: Stryzhavka urban hromada
- Founded: 1600

Area
  - Total: 2,001 km^{2} (773 sq mi)
- Elevation: 241 m (791 ft)

Population (2001)
  - Total: 400
  - Density: 0.20/km^{2} (0.52/sq mi)
- Time zone: UTC+2 (EET)
  - Summer (DST): UTC+3 (EEST)
- Postal code: 23216
- Area code: +380 432
- KOATUU: 0520682606
- KATOTTH: UA05020230050035361

Medvidka (Ukrainian: Медвідка, IPA: [medʲʋʲidkɐ], Polish: Medwidka) is a village in Ukraine, Vinnytsia Oblast, Vinnytsia Raion, Stryzhavka urban hromada, located in the historic region of Podolia, now located in southwestern Ukraine. Population: 400 (2001 estimate).

== History ==
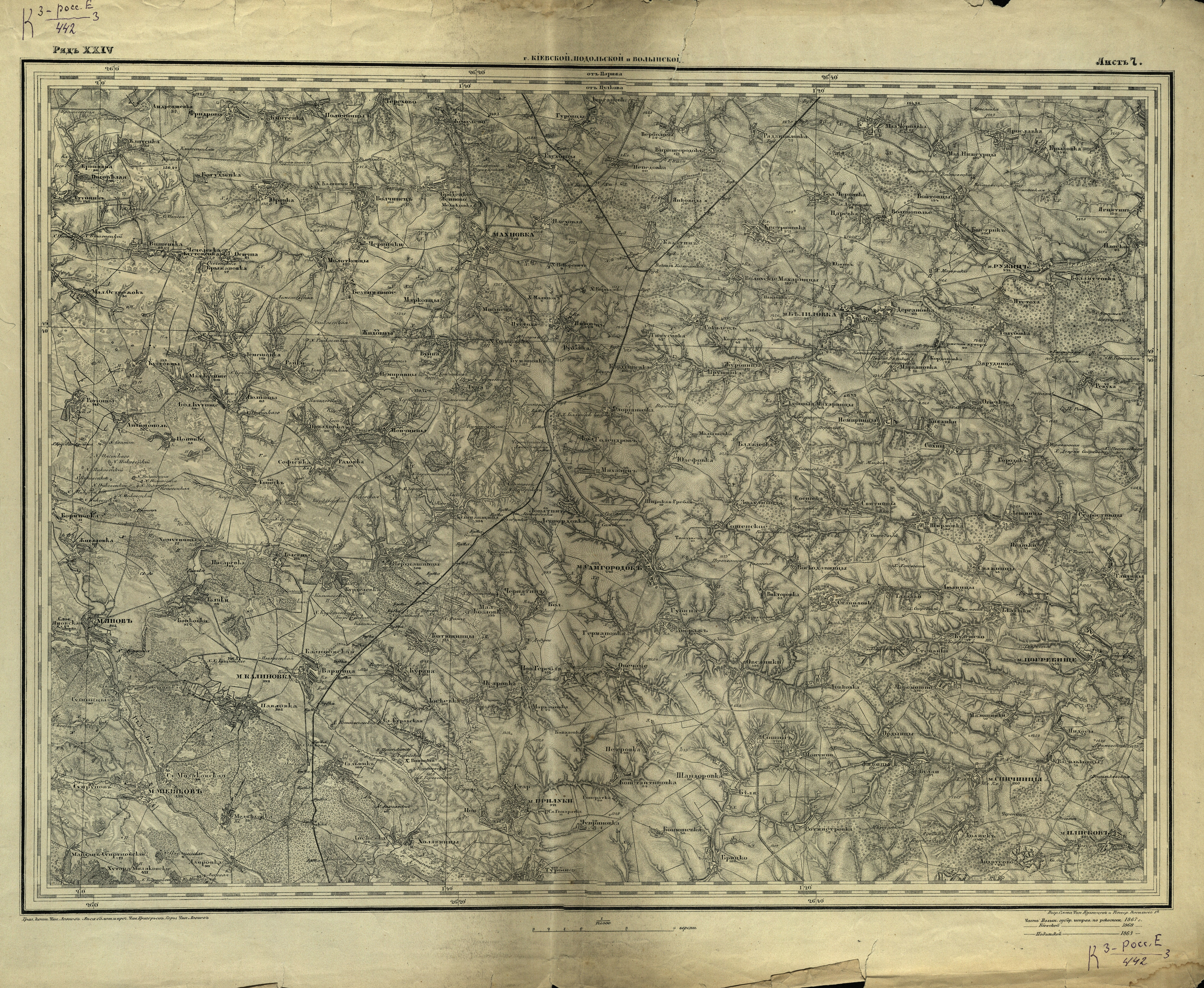
"Shubert's map". Fragment of topographic map of Russian Empire. 3 versta in inch. 1863.

The village is founded in 1600. First written mention 1616

The village has preserved and is actively working, the ancient wooden church of St. Martyr Paraskeva Pyatnitsa from the 17th century, which the villagers built at their own expense in 1679, and named in honor of the holy great martyr Paraskeva of Iconium.The church building is an architectural monument of local importance located in Vinnytsia Raion (district).

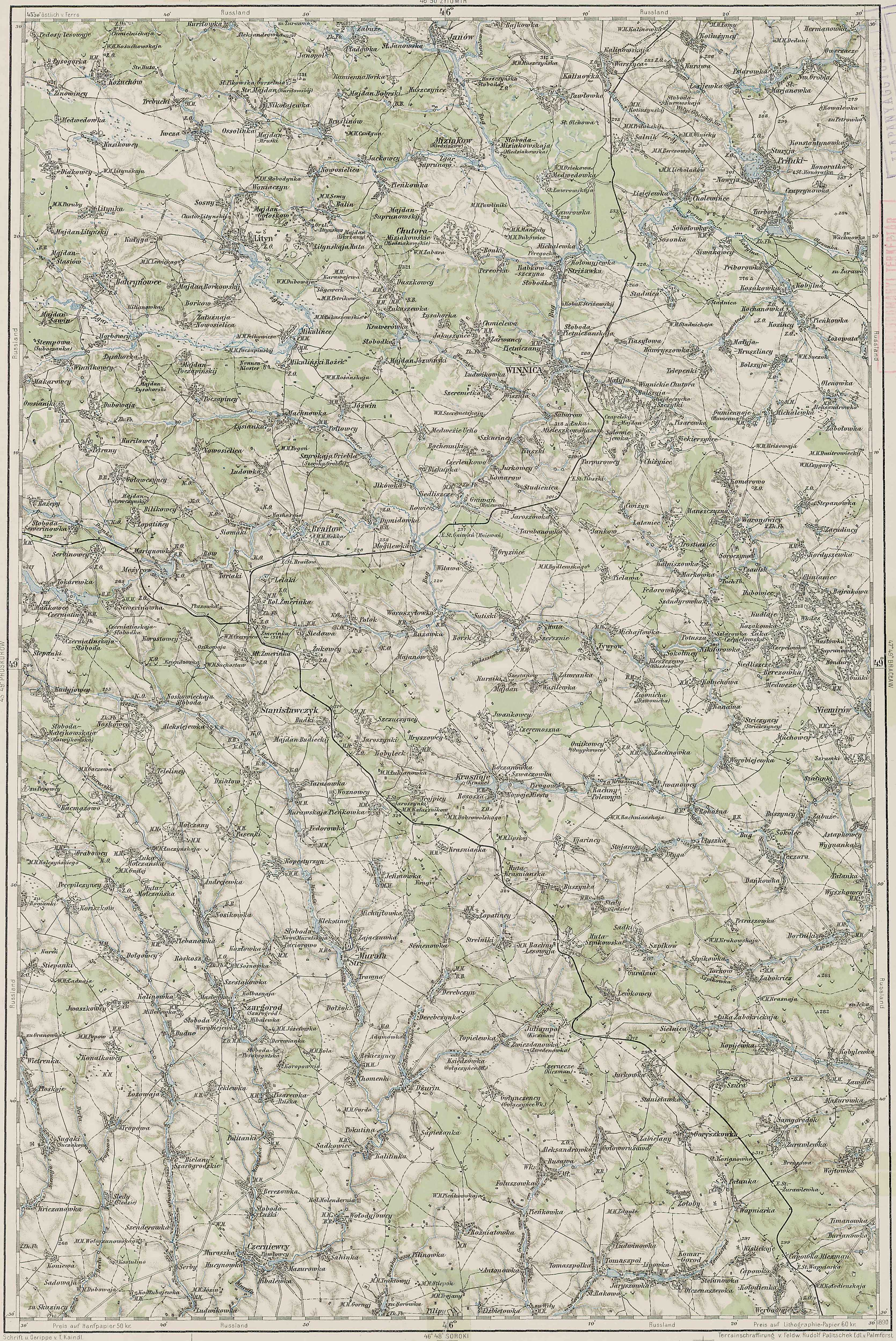
Régi térképek/Európa/Az Osztrák-Magyar Monarchia 1910 körül/Winnica

Perheps, the village Medvidka had a former name - Медвѣдовка (Medviedovka), since it is indicated on the military-topographic map of the prominent geodesist and cartographer Friedrich von Schubert and his co-author Tuchkov P.A. (1863). The name "Medwedowka" is also present on the Austro-Hungarian map of 1890 - 1910 (46-49 p.).

In the forest behind the Medvidka, not far from the hidden road between Mizyakivska Slobidka and Pavlivka, was the jews Stryzhavka ghetto.

On September 26, 2017, a fire broke out at an ammunition depot in Kalynivka, which caused significant damage to the village Medvidka. Several houses were destroyed, with many more houses damaged. A Primary school was almost destroyed.

== Geography ==
Medvidka occupies a lowland on the left side of the Southern Bug River, which flows one verst from the village. A small river Stavyshche (also known as river Medvedivka or river Vedmezha), flows through the village.
