= 2016 Naivasha traffic fireball =

Explosion caused by explosive chemicals on a highway near Naivasha, Kenya

2016 Naivasha Traffic Fireball
- Location of Nakuru County in Kenya
- Date: 11 December 2016; 9 years ago
- Location: Naivasha, Nakuru County, Kenya
- Deaths: 43
- Injuries: 50+

The Naivasha traffic fireball occurred on 11 December 2016 when a small truck (allegedly a Canter) carrying explosive chemicals lost control due to an unmarked road bump and exploded on a main highway near Naivasha, Kenya. The explosion caught up 10 other vehicles including a military vehicle and killed 43 people and injuring more than 50 people, according to the Kenya National Disaster Operation Centre.

Speculations pointed the cause of the explosion to be an oil tanker. This was picked up by both local and international media. It was later proved that the cause was a Mitsubishi Canter with Ugandan registration carrying highly flammable industrial chemical substance.

== Road safety in Kenya ==
Kenya is struggling to reduce the number of deaths on its roads. According to figures released by Kenya's National Transport and Safety Authority, 1,574 people died in road accidents during the first half of 2016.

== See also ==
- List of explosions
