= Eric Dick (lawyer) =

American lawyer

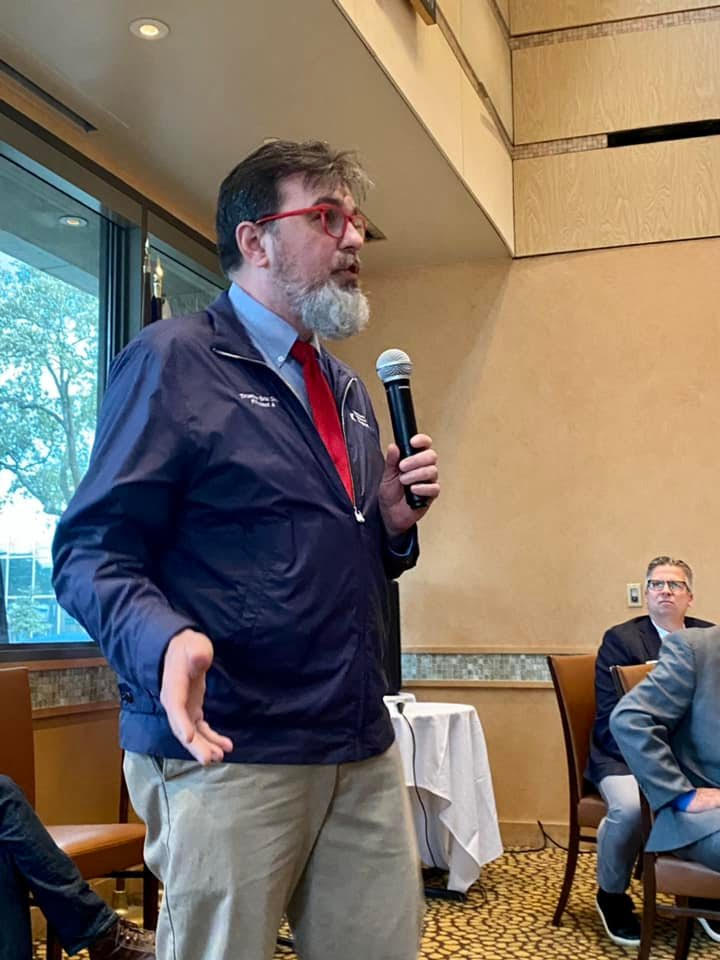
- Dick in 2015

Trustee of the Harris County Department of Education
- Incumbent
- Assumed office January 1, 2017
- Preceded by: Andrea Duhon
- Constituency: Position 2, Precinct 4 (2017–2022); Position 4, Precinct 3 (2023–present)

Personal details
- Born: November 27, 1977 (age 48) Houston, Texas
- Party: Republican
- Spouse: Danielle Dick
- Children: 3
- Education: Houston Community College, University of Phoenix, Cooley Law School, University of Alabama School of Law, Rice University, Duke University

Eric Dick is an American insurance lawyer who specializes in denied or underpaid property insurance claims. Dick represented clients in property insurance claims arising from events like Hurricane Harvey and 2020 Houston explosion. Dick was involved in lawsuits to overturn Houston charitable feeding ban and term limits extension.

Dick is the owner of the Houston law firm Dick Law Firm, PLLC, which he established in 2008. He is the president of the Harris County Board of Education since 2017.

== Education ==
Dick earned an Associate in Science from Houston Community College in 2000. Eric received a bachelor's degree in Business Science of Management from the University of Phoenix in 2005. He later pursued an LL.M. in Taxation from the University of Alabama School of Law in 2010. Pursuing his interest in law, he completed a Juris Doctor degree from Cooley Law School in 2008.

== Electoral history ==
Dick's first run for public office was in 2013 in the Houston Mayoral Election. He received 10% of the vote when running against incumbent Annise Parker and Ben Hall.

In 2015, in the race for At-Large Position 2 of the Houston City Council, he received over 35,000 votes in a race against incumbent David W. Robinson and Willie R. Davis.

In 2017, Trustee Dick was elected to Position 2, Precinct 4, and his term expired on December 31, 2022. Trustee Duhon's former Position 4, Precinct 3, seat was left vacant effective January 2, 2023, leaving an open seat on the HCDE Board.

In the 2019 general election for Houston City Council At-Large Position 5, Dick entered a runoff and received over 80,000 votes.

In the 2022 general election for Harris County Treasurer, he received over 58,000 votes in the Republican primary.

On January 12, 2023, HCDE Board met in a "Called Board" meeting and appointed Dick to fill the unexpired portion of the Position 4, Precinct 3 seat. His term will end on December 31, 2024.

== Controversies ==
In 2011, during a political campaign, Dick was accused of improperly placing campaign signs, which led to a dispute with the City of Houston.

Dick has also been involved in issues with the Texas Ethics Commission (TEC) regarding improper campaign finance reporting and fraudulent mailer content during his 2022 campaign for Harris County Treasurer. The TEC fined Dick for these matters, which he addressed as part of his campaign activities and failed to provide factual justification.

In 2020, Dick was accused in a lawsuit of sending unsolicited text messages during his political campaign.

Additionally, Dick has faced allegations regarding his relationships with expert witnesses in litigation cases, specifically that he used expert witness’ testimony without their knowledge or consent. He has received sanctions for these actions. In one instance, an appraiser filed a lawsuit regarding services rendered.

== Advertising ==
Dick has used his last name in marketing strategies, leading to memorable slogans. His taglines, such as "Hire a Dick!", "Need a Lawyer? Hire a Dick!" and "I'll work hard and long for you", have been highlighted in his television and radio commercials.
