= Hapur chemical plant explosion =

2022 explosion in Hapur, India

- Date: 4 June 2022
- Location: Hapur, Uttar Pradesh, India; 25°39′34.0632″N 83°23′53.8800″E
- Cause: Chemical plant explosion
- Deaths: 13
- Injuries: 20

On 4 June 2022, a major explosion and fire occurred at a chemical plant in Hapur, Uttar Pradesh, India. At least 13 people were killed and 20 others injured.

A map of Hapur district, part of Uttar Pradesh, India

== Details of the disaster ==
The explosion took place on a Saturday afternoon at the Ruhi Industries electronic equipment manufacturing unit where 33 people were working. The magnitude caused roofs to blow off houses, with sound travelling 10 km away. The factory was owned by Dilshad of Meerut, and had been leased to Wasim of Hapur. After the explosion, Wasim fled the scene after receiving medical treatment but was later arrested. A forensic science laboratory criminal investigation was initiated by Chief Minister Yogi Adityanath in order to determine the exact cause of the blast.

=== After further investigation ===
Initial reports were of a burst boiler which had caused the explosion. However the subsequent suspected cause was gunpowder used to manufacture toy gun pellets, because police retrieved plastic pellets used in their manufacture from the scene. This was despite the factory's license obtained in 2021 to manufacture electronic equipment not toy guns.

== Location ==
The factory is located in Dhaluana, at the Uttar Pradesh State Industrial Development Corporation governed industrial district of Hapur, 60 Kilometers from New Delhi, the capital of India. Hapur coordinates: 25°39′34.0632″N 83°23′53.8800″E

== Local response ==
The local response was rapid. The Chief Minister announced a rescue and relief operation with victims to be supported. Firefighters worked for three hours to extinguish the fire, and forensic technicians gathered evidence. Prime Minister Narendra Modi offered his condolences to those affected, and the state government offered support for the treatment of victims.

== Mortality and morbidity ==
Thirteen people were killed and 20 injured. Eleven of those who died came from the areas of Bahraich (Uttar Pradesh) and Bihar. Wasim, owner of the factory suffered burns and incurred stitches. Victims were taken to hospitals for medical care in Delhi, Noida, Ghaziabad and Meerut, including Safdarjung Hospital for optimal treatment.

== Consequences ==
The owner and operator of the factory were charged under Indian Penal Code sections 286, 287, 304, 308, 337 and 338. As a result, further investigations were carried out in neighboring factories to ensure licenses were correctly used.

== See also ==
- 2022 Sitakunda fire, on the same day
- List of explosions
