= 2007 Maputo arms depot explosion =

- Date: 22 March 2007
- Location: Maputo, Mozambique
- Deaths: 103
- Injuries: 515

The 2007 Maputo arms depot explosion were a series of explosions, which occurred in the afternoon of March 22, 2007, from around 16:45 to at least 18:00, in the Malhazine suburb of Maputo, the capital of Mozambique. At least 103 people were killed, and hundreds more were injured in the blasts.

== Background ==
The arms depot was constructed by the Soviet Union in 1984. The building housed Soviet-manufactured weapons used during the Mozambican Civil War.

In addition, a heat wave and drought had been affecting the area for much of the summer, with temperatures around 35 °C (93 °F) being reported. The same heat wave was blamed for a much smaller explosion at the depot on January 28, 2007.

== Casualties and damage ==
Health Minister Ivo Garrido said on March 23 that 83 fatalities (later updated to 93) were reported and that more than 300 people were injured. Most of the casualties were either military personnel working at the depot or civilians, many of them children, who lived in a nearby poor neighborhood. As a result, the government announced three days of national mourning and declared that flags be flown at half mast.

The Interior Ministry ordered police to seal off the area to prevent looting of homes in the area abandoned after the explosion.

The explosions could be heard all over the city, and even 9 km (about 5.5 miles) from the building, windows exploded.

A later report would update the number of casualties to 103 dead and 515 wounded.

== Cause ==
The Defense Ministry blamed the explosion on high temperatures.

== Reaction ==
The Interior Ministry ordered police and firefighters to aid the military in destroying the remaining ammunition at the depot, which had not been used since the country's civil war and was considered obsolete.

== See also ==
- List of explosions
