= 1885 Dynamite explosion =

Roadside dynamite explosion in Ontario, Canada

- Part of Trent–Severn Waterway construction
- Date: September 4, 1885
- Location: Douro, Ontario, Canada; 44.537°N 78.082°W
- Deaths: 2

On September 4, 1885 a wagon loaded with dynamite exploded at Douro, Ontario, Canada, killing two men and their horses.

The blast was felt 50 miles (80 km) away. A historical plaque marks the location.

== Background ==
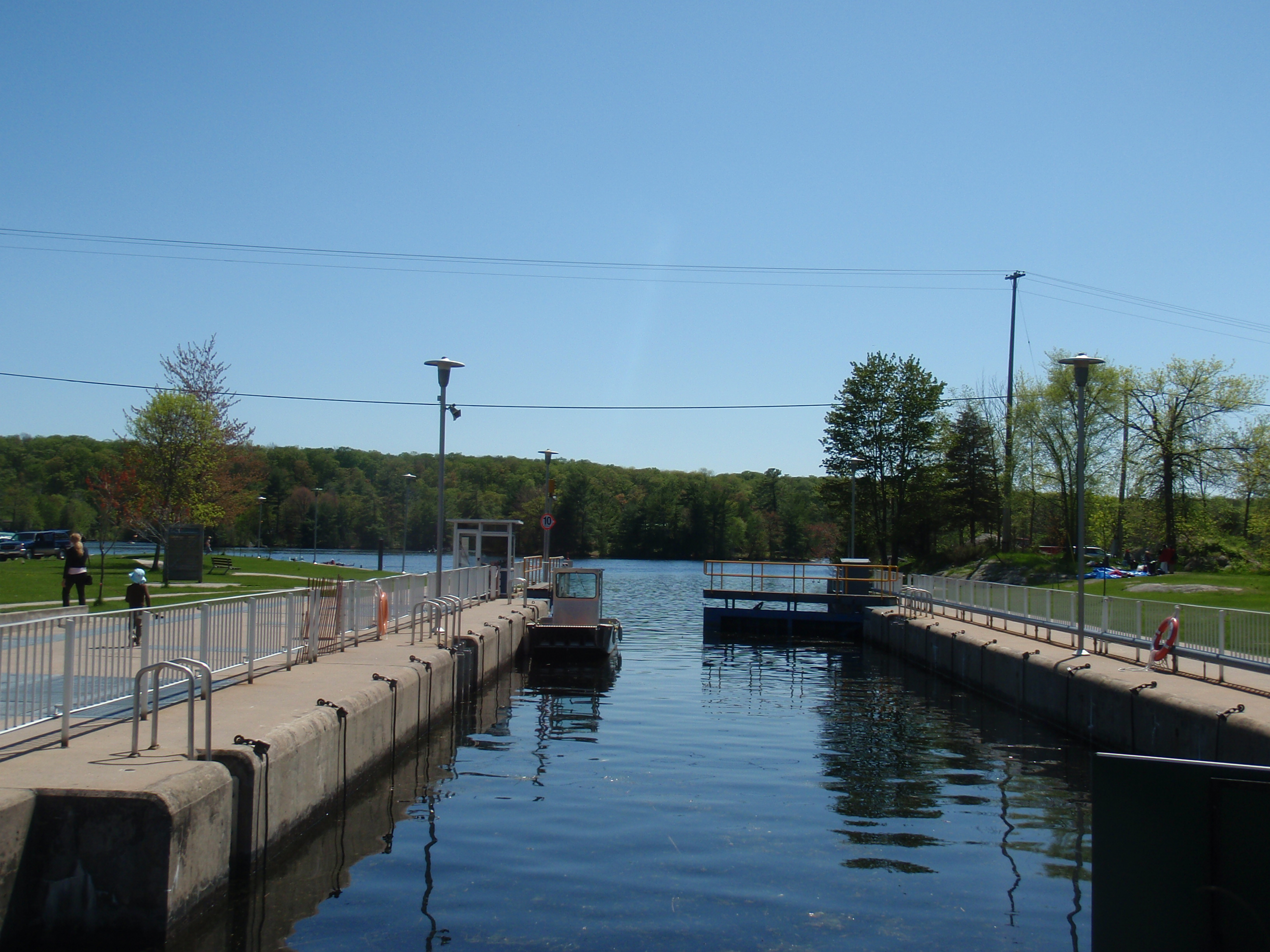
Lock at the Trent-Severn, 2009

George Morton and James Simmons were transporting a wagon load of dynamite from Tweed, Ontario to Burleigh Falls, Ontario to be used for the rock blasting of the Trent Canal lock. They stayed overnight at a hotel in Indian River on September 3, 1885.

== Explosion ==
Their load exploded at 9:45 am on September 4, 1885 on the 6th Line (road) at Douro, Ontario, noted as being a corduroy road and rough to travel in poor weather. Both men were killed in the blast and the only parts of the men that were found were "a finger, two tiny sections of a skull, a tiny piece of cheek identified by the whiskers, and what appeared to be a man's shoulder that was found hanging on the branch of a tree 300 feet (91 m) distant." The blast blew the metal shoes off the horses hooves and broke windows in Selwyn, Ontario and Campbellford. The shock wave was felt in Tweed, 50 miles (80 km) away.

Sources at the time describe a 8 feet (2.4 m) deep by 60 feet (18 m) wide crater, and 1960s sources report a 10 feet (3.0 m) deep and 70 feet (21 m) wide crater being left by the blast and trees were flattened in a radius that varied between 50 yards (46 m) and 75 yards (69 m).

== Aftermath ==
The blast site aroused public interest for subsequent weeks. Reports on visitor numbers vary between 300 and 1,000.

== See also ==
- List of explosions
