= 2020 Volgograd explosion =

Gas station explosion in Volgograd, Russia

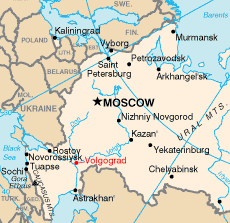
- Volgograd, the location of the explosion
- Date: 10 August 2020
- Time: 12:40 SAMT (8:40 UTC)
- Location: Volgograd, Russia
- Deaths: 0
- Injuries: 13

On the afternoon of 10 August 2020, a large explosion occurred at a gas station in Volgograd, Russia. The explosion caused 13 injuries and could be felt thousands of meters away.

== Explosion ==
On the afternoon of 10 August, a large fire broke out at a gas station in Volgograd, Russia. Firefighters were called around 12:40 local time (8:40 UTC) to battle the blaze. The fire soon went out of control producing a large explosion. This explosion was accompanied by a shockwave which could be felt thousands of meters away. The shockwave knocked down firefighters and injured 13 people. Fortunately, all staff at the gas station were able to safely evacuate before the fire escalated. The explosion also caused a huge fireball which rose several hundred meters into the air. It took 70 firefighters and a firefighting robot to finally extinguish the fire.

== Footage ==
Video of the explosion soon became viral on social media networks. Some residents of the area ventured out to film the blast. The video was widely shared on YouTube in the days following the explosion.

== See also ==
- 1947 Texas City Disaster
- List of industrial disasters
- List of explosions
