= 2007 Haradh, Saudi Arabia gas pipeline explosion =

2007 Haradh, Saudi Arabia, gas pipeline explosion occurred just after midnight on 18 November 2007 at a natural gas pipeline near Haradh gas plant and at a distance of thirty kilometers (eighteen miles) off the Hawiya gas plant in eastern Saudi Arabia. The plant and the pipeline are operated by Saudi Aramco, the country's national oil company, and contract workers were linking a new pipe to the line at the time of the explosion.

According to first reports, twenty-eight workers, including five Aramco employees, died in the explosion. Their nationalities were not specified by the company, nor the number of the injured. According to diplomatic sources, most of the dead were Asian workers along with at least one Lebanese national. According to Arab News, King Fahd Hospital in Al-Ahsa had received 10 non-Saudi workers who were injured. However, the next day, as a special technical panel set up by Saudi Aramco continued its probe yesterday to determine the reason for the blast and the subsequent fire, it was announced that the death toll had risen to 38. The death toll was later determined as 40, three of whom were identifiable, while a special fatwa from the Senior Ulema Council of Saudi Arabia had to be obtained to allow the bodies charred beyond recognition, some of whom were Muslims and some of whom non-Muslims, to be buried together.

There was no immediate suggestion of a terrorist link to the incident and the incident was affirmed as being purely maintenance-related by Aramco.

Haradh and Hawiya plants, opened 2002-2003, are among Saudi Arabia’s major gas-processing plants, in the desert near the Ghawar Field, the world’s largest, south of Dhahran.

== Sources ==
- "Saudi Arabia Gas Explosion Kills 28". New York Times. 2007-11-19.
