= 2020 Narayanganj explosion =

Mosque explosion in Bangladesh

2020 Narayanganj blast
- Date: September 4, 2020
- Time: 8:30 pm BST
- Location: Fatullah, Narayanganj Sadar Upazila, Narayanganj District, Bangladesh; 23°38′46″N 90°29′8″E
- Cause: Gas leak
- Deaths: 31
- Injuries: 40

On 4 September 2020, an explosion in Baitus Salat Jame mosque in Narayanganj District, Bangladesh killed at least 31 people while dozens more were injured. The death toll rose to 31 on 10 September.

== Causes ==
The explosion is presumed to have been caused by a gas leak from an underground pipeline. At around 8:30 pm local time, all the six air conditioning units installed on the ground floor exploded simultaneously. Earlier, there were power outages in the mosque and a sudden surge of electricity caused sparks on the air conditioners which may have led to the explosion.

== See also ==
- List of explosions
