= Chongqing explosion =

2022 gas explosion in Chongqing, China

Wulong District canteen gas explosion
- Date: 7 January 2022
- Time: 12：10 (UTC+8)
- Location: Wulong District, Chongqing, China
- Cause: Gas leak
- Deaths: 16
- Injuries: 10

On 7 January 2022, an explosion caused by a gas leak in a canteen building in Wulong District, Chongqing, southwest China, killed at least 16 people and injured 10 others.

== See also ==
- 2009 Chongqing mine blast
