= 2023 Makhachkala gas station explosion =

Gas explosion in Dagestan, Russia

- Date: 14 August 2023
- Time: 21:40 (MSK, UTC+3)
- Location: Makhachkala, Dagestan, Russia; 43.037648°N 47.451958°E
- Deaths: 35
- Injuries: at least 80

On 14 August 2023, a gas station exploded in the city of Makhachkala, Dagestan, Russia, killing 35 people and injuring at least 80 others.

== Explosion ==
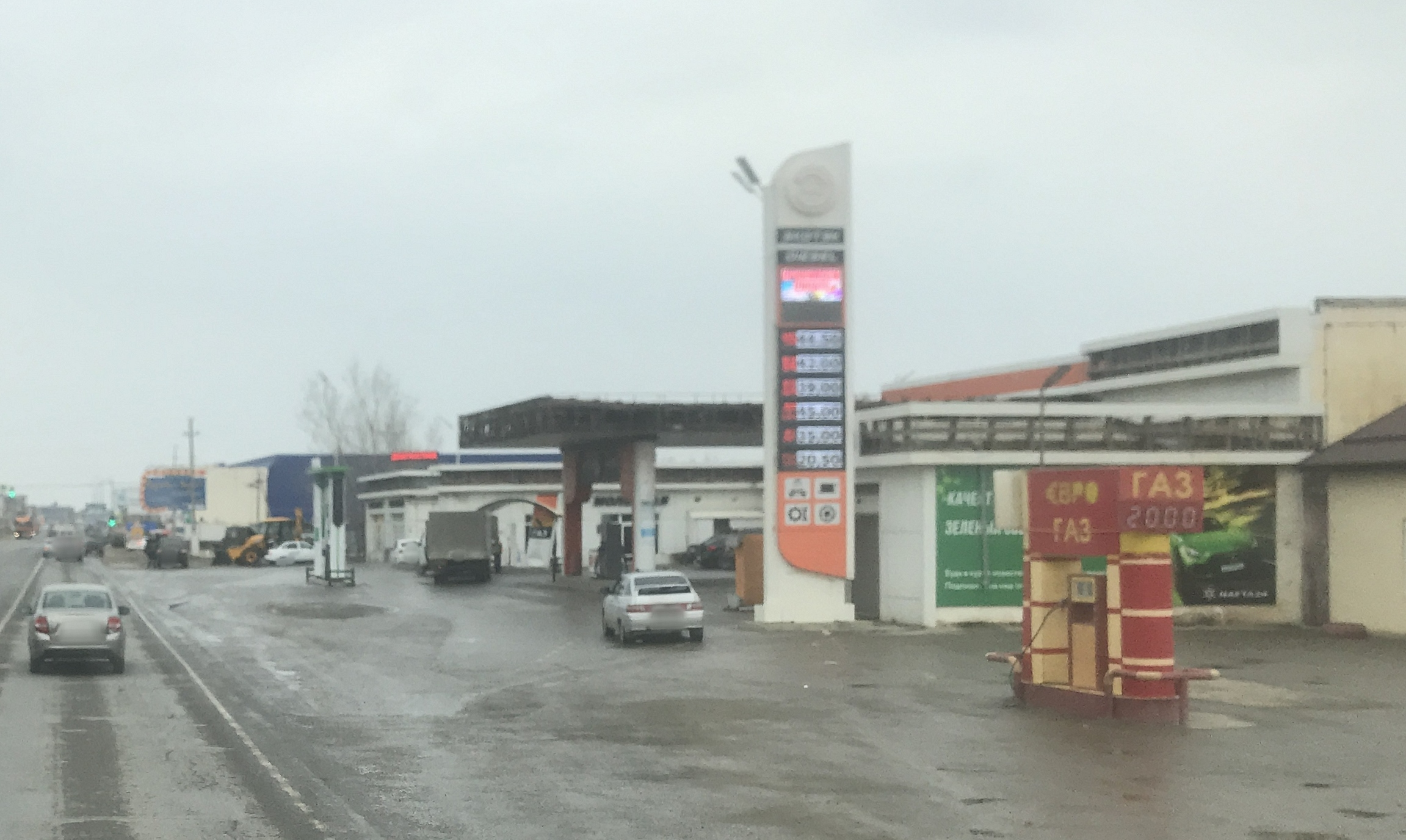
The gas station involved in the explosion pictured in 2020

The explosion occurred at 21:40 MSK (18:40 UTC). A fire had originally started at a nearby auto repair shop which later spread to the gas station. At some point two of the station's eight external gas tanks exploded, killing 35 people and injuring at least 80, many of whom have suffered severe burns from the flaming fuel ejected in the explosion. The fire spread to an area of 600 square metres (6,500 sq ft), leading to a potential risk of further explosions. Forty houses and a hotel were also damaged.

According to the head of the Association of Gas Stations of Dagestan, 90–100 tons of ammonium nitrate, equivalent to 35 tons of TNT, was illegally stored across the street from the gas station and exploded in the fire.

== Aftermath ==
A state of emergency was declared in the Kumtorkalinsky district of Dagestan according to Governor Sergei Melikov. The Ministry of Emergency Situations said it had sent aircraft to evacuate casualties to hospitals in Moscow. According to TASS, members of the Federal Center for Disaster Medicine of the Ministry of Health and members of various medical organizations in Moscow have come to Dagestan to help. As of 15 August 2023, search and rescue operations are still ongoing, with emergency workers still searching for survivors and clearing rubble.

== Investigation ==
The Investigative Committee of Russia has opened a criminal case and launched an investigation into the explosion.

== Reactions ==
The government of Russia published messages of condolences from President Vladimir Putin and the Head of Dagestan Sergey Melikov, in which they promised to pay 1 million Russian rubles to the families of the deceased, as well as declared a day of mourning. According to the messages President Putin "expressed condolences to the families and friends of those killed in the explosion ... and wished a speedy recovery to the victims." Authorities in Dagestan also said that the injured in the explosion would receive between 200,000 ₽ and 400,000 ₽.
