= 2020 Houston explosion =

Industrial disaster in Houston, Texas in 2020

- Date: January 24, 2020
- Location: Houston, Texas, U.S.; 29.8369°N 95.5456°W
- Deaths: 3
- Injuries: 18
- Property damage: 200 nearby buildings damaged

On January 24, 2020, a building at Watson Grinding and Manufacturing in northwest Houston, Texas, United States, exploded at 4:24 a.m. Debris was scattered as far as one-half mile (0.8 km), and approximately 200 nearby houses and businesses were damaged. Officials asked local residents to search for debris and body parts to assist with an investigation into the explosion's cause. An absence of zoning ordinances separating industrial areas from residences is known to prevail in the vicinity of the explosion.

== Explosion and aftermath ==
Two deaths were reported on the morning of the incident. Both men were employees of Watson Grinding and Manufacturing. A third man, whose home was impacted by debris from the explosion, died from his injuries on February 5. Eighteen people "self reported" to emergency rooms for minor injuries. Forty-eight people sought shelter from Red Cross, and two schools in the vicinity were closed for the day. Some homes near the facility were blasted off their foundations, and some had collapsed ceilings, shattered windows, and bent garage doors.

Bureau of Alcohol, Tobacco, Firearms and Explosives personnel assisted the Houston Fire and Police Departments with the investigation. Multiple lawsuits were filed on the day of the explosion.

Watson Grinding and Manufacturing filed for bankruptcy in February 2020. Watson Grinding had a gas detection system that was found to be non-functional after the explosion. The gas detectors were serviced, maintained and calibrated by outside expert vendors, including Teledyne Detcon and 3M in 2017, 2018 and 2019 until the explosion.

Over 2,200 community members filed lawsuits that were consolidated into multi-district litigation in Harris County Texas: Cause No. 2021-15294, In Re: January 24, 2020 Explosion, In the 11th Judicial District Court of Harris County, Texas, Judge Mark Davidson presiding.

Eventually most of the Defendants settled with Plaintiffs, with Plaintiffs receiving partial settlements.

Four jury trials took place against the 3M Company between June 2025 - August 2026, led by Liaison Counsel, Rob Kwok of Kwok Daniel Ltd LLP. In June 2025, a Harris County Jury returned a verdict for $38 million, partially against 3M. In November 2025, a Harris County Jury returned a verdict for $118 million, partially against 3M. In August 2026, a Harris County Jury returned a verdict for $61.5 million, partially against 3M.

In 2026 a related lawsuit went to trial and made it into the news when the expert witness' ChatGPT prompts were made public.

== Cause ==
The U.S. Chemical Safety and Hazard Investigation Board released its final investigation report on June 29, 2023. According to the report, the explosion was caused by a disconnected propylene hose that caused propylene to accumulate in the coating building. Contributing to the leak was the Coating Supervisor's failure to close the shutoff valves of the propylene tank supplying the building. Another contributing factor was the leak detection system, which was disconnected from its control computer. When functioning normally, it would have alerted the operator and automatically shut the propylene supply valves.

The 3M Company was the expert vendor in charge of calibrating and maintaining the gas detection system at Watson Grinding. The 3M technician who last serviced the gas detectors at in June 2019 wrote in his exit notes "No follow-up action required." However, in the 4th jury trial in August 2026, the 3M supervisor testified he was made aware in 2017 that the Watson gas detection was non-functional. The jury returned a record jury verdict in favor of a group of Plaintiff community members in excess of $61.5 million.

The accumulated propylene was ignited after a worker entered the building and turned on lighting. The USCSB prepared a video on the incident and released it on their YouTube channel on 25 February 2025.

== See also ==
- List of 21st-century explosions
