= Kenya National Disaster Operation Centre =

The Kenya National Disaster Operation Centre (NDOC) is a Kenyan governmental agency. It was established in 1998 to deal with management and coordination of disaster response at a national level in Kenya.
