= 2016 Mississauga explosion =

2016 explosion in Mississauga, Ontario, Canada

Coordinates: 43.6252°N 79.6095°W

2016 Mississauga House Explosion
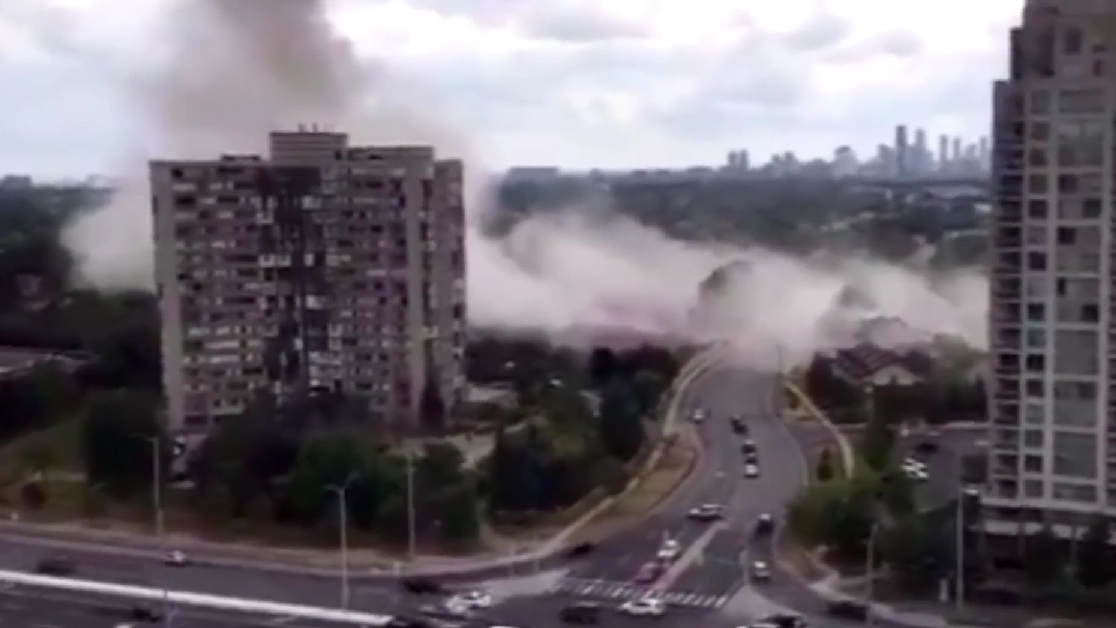
- Large fire after explosion
- Date: June 28, 2016
- Location: Mississauga, Ontario, Canada
- Deaths: 2
- Injuries: 9

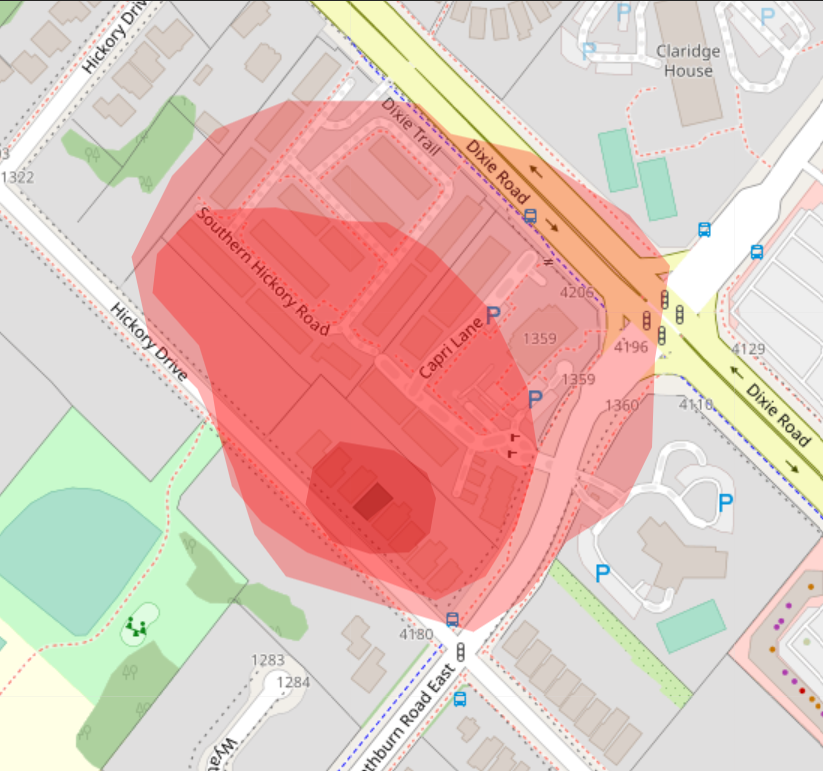
Dark red displays complete destruction, while lighter shades show damage levels to the surrounding area

On June 28, 2016, a residential house exploded in the Hickory neighbourhood in Mississauga, Ontario, Canada, as a result of a suicide attempt according to investigators.

== Explosion ==
The explosion occurred at around 4:20pm, centred around a house at 4201 Hickory Drive. This prompted mass evacuations of the surrounding area, with about 700 homes evacuated. Houses were heavily damaged on Hickory Drive, Capri Townhome complex and the Hickory Village. One house was completely destroyed, with 24 others damaged. Debris was scattered around the neighbourhood, hitting and breaking windows of surrounding apartment buildings, also causing a shockwave that could be felt in the nearby Rockwood Mall, which was evacuated.

The cause of the explosion was found to have been the intentional disconnect of the gas piping from the house's hot water tank in two locations, allowing the gas to build up and generating explosive force.

== Investigation and aftermath ==
The following police investigation resulted in the explosion being ruled the double suicide of a married couple, 55-year-old Dianne Page and 55-year-old Robert Nadler, who owned the property. Nadler had previously served 10 years in prison after being convicted of his best friend's murder after a financial dispute in 1992, initially being sentenced for life and then released on parole. Handwritten notes describing physical and mental health challenges and financial difficulties, likely written by Page, were found among the debris of the property at the centre of the blast. The couple reportedly lived in isolation, with aluminium foil covering the windows of their house.

Six months after the explosion, 33 homes were still empty and required renovation. Four homes were demolished.
