= Haradh gas plant =

Haradh Gas Plant
- Country: Saudi Arabia
- Location: Near Haradh village, Eastern Province
- Coordinates: 24°03′25″N 49°12′11″E
- Status: Operational
- Commission date: April 2003

The Haradh Gas Plant is one of the major gas plants in Saudi Arabia. It is located near Haradh village, 300 km southwest of Dhahran. The plant has a capacity of producing 1.6 BSCFD of natural gas and 170,000 BBL/day of condensate (oil). The plant processes only non-associated gas. The plant is considered to be a mid-size, when compared to other sister plants in the region. However, the amount of oil processed is considered to be relatively large.

The plant started operating in April 2003.
