= 2025 Gujarat factory fire =

2025 factory fire in Gujarat, India

- Date: 1 April 2025
- Location: near Deesa, Gujarat, India; 24°14′06″N 72°10′58″E
- Type: Explosion
- Cause: Highly flammable aluminium powder
- Deaths: 21
- Injuries: 6

On 1 April 2025, an explosion at a warehouse manufacturing fireworks in the suburbs of Deesa, India, killed 21 of the 24 people inside of the building at the time of the incident. The warehouse, named Deepak Fatakda, had its license expire the previous year, and was not qualified to continue business. Highly reactive and cheap aluminium powder was found to be the cause in a forensic probe conducted in the incident's aftermath. An ex gratia payment was announced by Indian Prime Minister Narendra Modi in response.

== Overview ==
The area of West Bengal has a history of firework factory incidents, killing 20 people before this event since 2023. Just the day before, eight people, four of whom were children, were killed after a family who had improperly stored fireworks in their home as a makeshift business had their supply explode. This larger incident took place the day after on 1 April 2025, where at least 21 workers were killed and six others were injured in an explosion at a firecracker warehouse on the suburbs of Deesa town in Banaskantha district in Gujarat, India. The business, called Deepak Fatakda, killed 21 of the 24 people in the building at the time of the explosion, eight of whom were children.

In response, India's Prime Minister Narendra Modi announced an ex gratia payment of ₹200,000 (US$2,100) to the next of kin of the victims. Chief Minister of Gujarat Bhupendra Patel also announced a financial assistance of ₹400,000 (US$4,200) to the families of the victims and ₹50,000 (US$520) to the injured persons.

A forensic probe confirmed that the blast was triggered by highly reactive aluminium powder present in the building. Furthermore, the business was not qualified to manufacture fireworks, having its license to do so expire in 2024. As a result of the malpractice, the owners Khubchandbhai Mohnani and Deepakbhai Mohnani were arrested.
