= Tasajera explosion =

2020 explosion in Tasajera, Colombia

Tasajera fuel tanker explosion
- Date: 6 July 2020
- Time: About 0800–0830 (GMT-5)
- Location: Tasajera, Pueblo Viejo, Colombia; 10°58′41″N 74°19′50″W
- Type: Fuel tanker explosion
- Cause: Looters inadvertently igniting spilled gasoline
- Deaths: 45
- Injuries: 19

The Tasajera explosion took place in the village of Tasajera, municipality of Pueblo Viejo, Colombia on Monday, 6 July 2020. A tanker truck that was transporting gasoline to Barranquilla along a Caribbean road overturned in Tasajera. According to the Magdalena police report, the driver swerved, lost control, and went off the road; the driver was uninjured. Some of the villagers took advantage of the situation to collect the fuel. When they tried to steal the vehicle's battery by extracting it, the gasoline exploded, leaving 45 people dead and at least 19 injured.

== Background ==
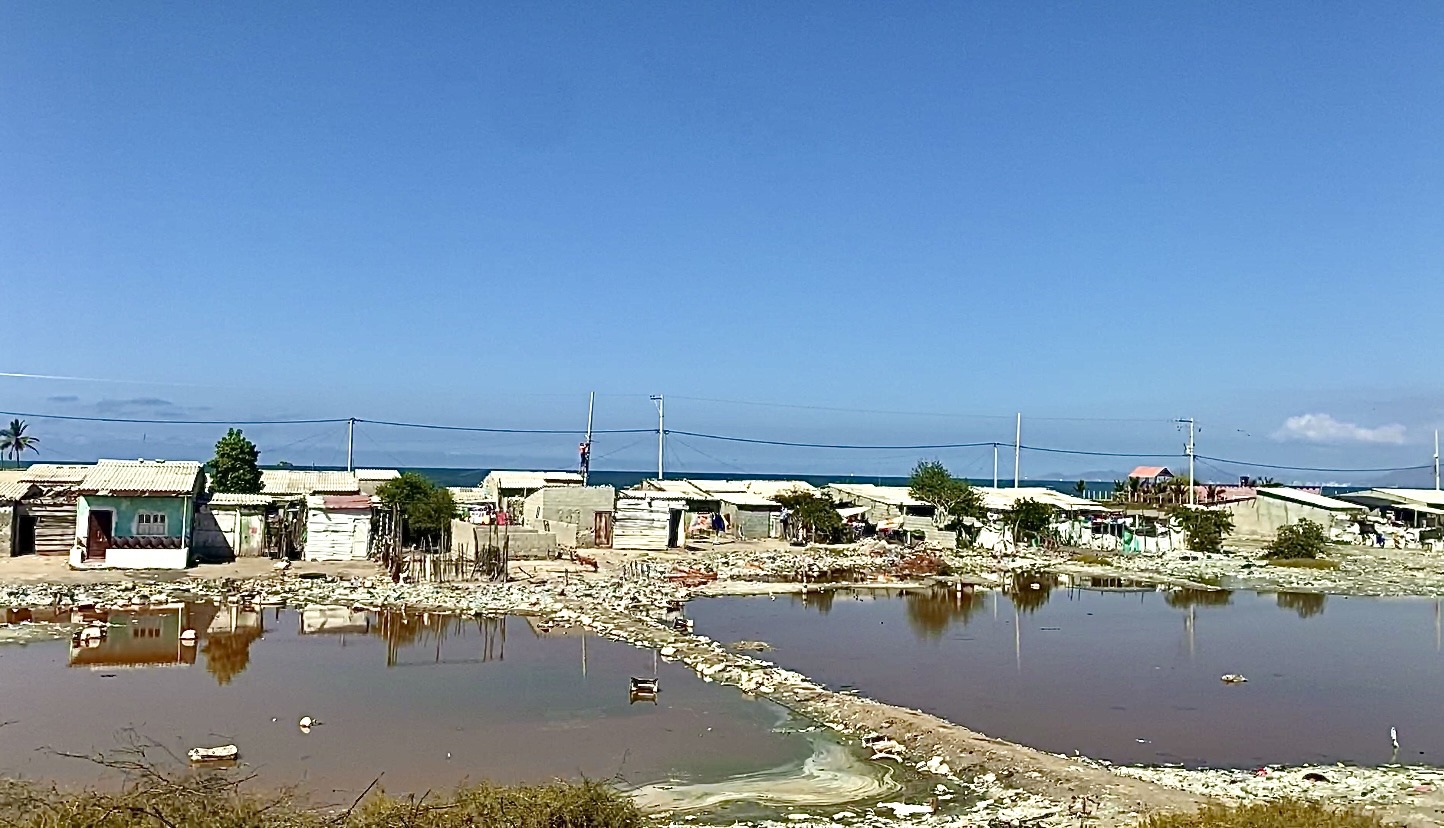
The village of Tasajera in 2022

The village of Tasajera is a poor fishing village that is built on a narrow strip of land between the Caribbean Sea and a swamp. Many of the villagers live on huts built on trash. Over the past two decades, the village has been struggling financially, as the number of fish and oysters declined. There have been instances in the past where the villagers had previously looted stranded trucks for goods. During the COVID-19 pandemic, the residents faced restrictions that caused further financial strain. The lockdowns also decreased the number of motorists on the highways who were potential customers.

== Event ==
On 6 July 2020, a tanker truck driven by trucker Manuel Cataño Hernández was transporting gasoline to Barranquilla along the Caribbean highway. Around 0830, shortly after passing through the toll of that corregimiento, the truck overturned on the highway, ending up in an accident on the left side of the road with the driver inside, at kilometer 47 of the Tasajera corregimiento. According to the driver of the truck who survived the accident, he was able to get out of the truck by his own means and the overturning occurred due to avoiding a crocodile that was crossing, making a sudden maneuver and losing control of the truck.

Upon hearing the news of the accident, several residents of nearby towns, most of them from Tasajera, gathered at the scene of the accident with several gallons and empty buckets to steal gasoline to later be sold. The police who were at the scene were unable to stop them due to the large number of people.

While several people were getting gasoline out of the truck and checking the driver's cabin, as seen in a video taken by a witness at the scene, the truck's tank suddenly exploded, engulfing all the nearby people who were crowded around it with its flames. This instantly killed seven of them whose bodies were charred and wounded more than fifty other people, most of whom died over the next two weeks until 22 July, when the last death was recorded. All the registered victims were male and most were under 30 years of age, with some even being minors. Also, several of the victims were relatives to each other, so several families lost several members due to the incident.

== Possible cause of the explosion ==
In an amateur video recorded by a cell phone, the exact moment of the explosion was captured, but a potential ignition source was not visible. According to witnesses, the conflagration was generated when two of the people close to the car tried to detach the battery from it. Another reason could be the static electricity generated by the human body at a level sufficient to generate a spark triggered the explosion. Of these two hypotheses, the first was the most accepted by the authorities.

== Victims ==
The health authorities of Magdalena released the list of those killed. The bodies of seven of them were burned and had to be identified by DNA samples taken from their relatives. The other victims died in different hospitals to which they were transferred.

== Reactions ==
The governor of Magdalena, Carlos Caicedo, visited the relatives of several of the victims who were hospitalized at the same time that he asked the authorities for speed to clarify the causes of the accident.

Several celebrities such as Melissa Martínez Artuz, Jorge Cárdenas, Dayana Jaimes, Senator Gustavo Bolívar and Gabriela Tafur, made comments on their social networks about the tragedy. Some received criticism for their comments towards the victims.

The Texas Shriners Hospital in the United States, donated 35,000 square centimeters of skin grafts to start treatment for patients who were burned in the fire.

== Tribute ==
On 6 August 2020, a month after the tragedy, hundreds of relatives and friends of the victims organized a tribute and inaugurated a mural at the place where the explosion occurred with photos and names of the deceased to remember them.
