= 2024 Kampong Speu ammunition depot explosion =

Explosions at the Military Region 3 Headquarter of Kampong Speu, Cambodia

2024 Kampong Speu Ammunition Depot Explosion
- Location within Cambodia
- Date: April 27, 2024
- Time: Approx. 14:30 (GMT+7)
- Location: Military Region 3 Headquarters, Chbar Mon, Kampong Speu Province, Cambodia; 11°27′00″N 104°30′00″E
- Type: Ammunition explosion, accidental blast
- Cause: Technical error and mishandling during ammunition unloading
- Deaths: 20 soldiers
- Injuries: Several soldiers and civilians
- Property damage: 4 military buildings destroyed, 25 civilian houses damaged

The 2024 Kampong Speu ammunition depot explosion was a major military disaster that occurred on April 27, 2024, at the Royal Cambodian Armed Forces (RCAF) Military Region 3 headquarters located in Chbar Mon, Kampong Speu Province, Cambodia. The blast killed 20 soldiers, injured several others, and destroyed multiple military facilities and neighboring civilian structures.

== Event ==
On the afternoon of Saturday, April 27, 2024, at approximately 2:30 PM (local time), a sequence of powerful explosions erupted inside an ammunition warehouse within the Military Region 3 base. Shockwaves and resulting fires tore through the facility, completely destroying three ammunition storage buildings, an office building, and military barracks.

The force of the blast caused severe structural damage to at least 25 civilian homes in the adjacent village of Borei Kamakor, shattering windows, collapsing roofs, and starting localized fires.

== Victims ==
Twenty military personnel belonging to the Royal Cambodian Armed Forces were confirmed killed in the incident. Several other soldiers and nearby civilians sustained injuries ranging from minor lacerations to severe burns and trauma.

== Investigation ==
Following the incident, teams from the Cambodian Mine Action Centre (CMAC) and RCAF military officials secured the perimeter to clear unexploded ordnance (UXO) and launch a formal investigation into the root cause. Initial findings released by military authorities indicated that the blast occurred due to a "technique error" (technical mistake or mishandling) while military personnel were offloading and storing ammunition at the depot.

== Reactions ==
- Cambodian Government: Prime Minister Hun Manet expressed deep sorrow on behalf of the national government, publicly extending condolences to the families of the fallen soldiers. He ordered the Ministry of Defence and relevant authorities to arrange immediate financial aid ($20,000 for families of deceased soldiers and $5,000 for injured personnel) and funeral support, as well as assistance for injured civilians and damaged households.
- International Response: Foreign embassies and international bodies in Phnom Penh expressed condolences to Cambodia following the tragedy.

== See also ==
- Royal Cambodian Armed Forces
- Kampong Speu Province
