= 2020 Villa El Salvador explosion =

2020 explosion in Peru

Coordinates: 12°12′29.5″S 76°57′04.4″W

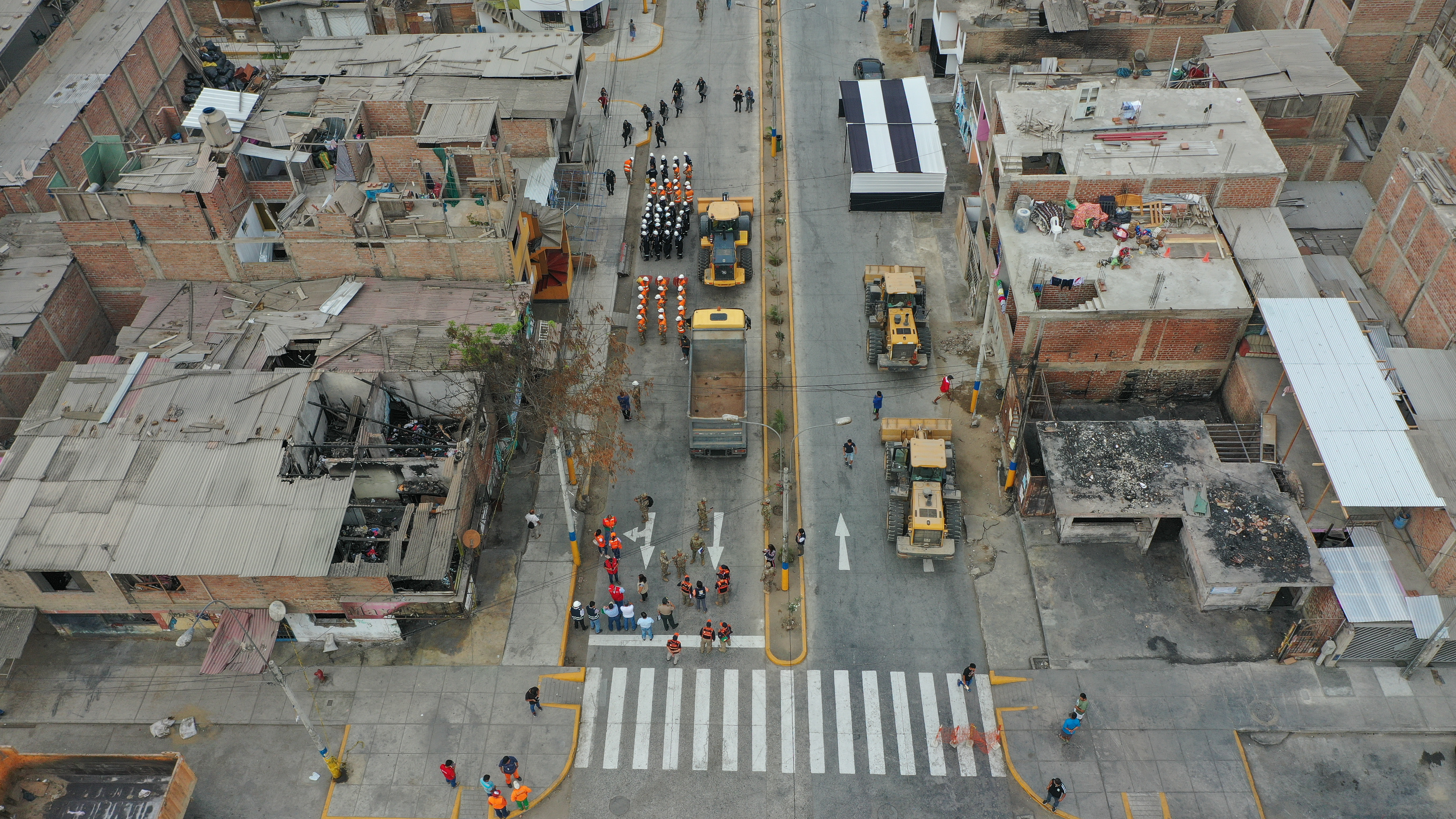
- Demolition of buildings damaged in the explosion
- Date: January 23, 2020
- Time: 06:50 a.m. (UTC-5)
- Location: Villa El Salvador, Lima, Peru
- Cause: Accident of a gas tank truck
- Deaths: 34
- Injuries: 28

On January 23, 2020, a gas leak from a truck transporting liquefied petroleum gas caused an explosion in Villa El Salvador, Lima metropolitan area, Peru. The subsequent fires affected at least 20 homes and several vehicles.

== Accident ==
On January 23, 2020, around 6:50 a.m. local time (UTC-5), a tanker truck of gas from the private company Transgas suffered an accident on Mariano Pastor Revilla Avenue, known as Route C in Villa el Salvador, district of Lima. According to the video of a security camera in the area, the truck was traveling along the avenue, until it reached the intersection with Villa del Mar Avenue, which had a slope. When trying to pass through this, the truck hit the slope strongly, which caused a break in a valve that was at the bottom of the truck. Because of this, the LPG contained in the truck began to escape from the tank in a matter of minutes, expanding by about 250 meters. The truck driver got off and tried to repair and close the valve without success, so he started yelling at people to get away from the scene. After the expansion of the gas by a block, there was a deflagration caused by a small spark that was advancing until it reached the tank truck. As a result, one person died instantly and several were injured, in addition to causing several fires throughout that block. Many of the injured were very close to the gas leak or sleeping in their homes. The lack of information on how to act in situations of this kind caused people not to worry too much about the fact until a few seconds before the deflagration, which contributed to the large number of people injured.

== Consequences ==
More than 15 units of firefighters moved to the area of the event. The consequent fires were classified by the Fire Department as code 3 (out of control). More than 50 people were transferred to the Emergency Hospital of Villa El Salvador, which collapsed in the face of the number of injured, finally referring them to various hospitals in the capital. With the passing of the hours, 8 people died, including 2 minors. 20 homes were affected and several vehicles ended up burned. Several families were left homeless. The Minister of Health, Elizabeth Hinostroza, said the majority of the injured are in critical condition, so the number of deaths could increase with the passing of the hours. While the director of the Emergency Hospital of Villa El Salvador, Carlos León, said that the majority of the injured presented between 70% and 80% of the body burned. On the other hand, the municipality of Villa El Salvador closed the premises of the Transgas company after the incident occurred.

The truck driver, who also suffered burns and was initially considered deceased, was detained at the police station in Villa El Salvador.

Hours later, while the Firemen were still working in the area, there was a new gas leak very close to the scene. This incident was quickly resolved without serious incident.

== Investigation ==
The National Police of Peru are conducting investigations to determine fault.

== Responses ==
- The President of the Republic Martín Vizcarra during a trip to Trujillo said it was "a tragedy and that the causes must be investigated."
- After the fact, the authorities asked citizens for blood donation support, which eventually exceeded the necessary amount of donations. In addition, various people, institutions and companies organized to support the victims with food, clothing and hygiene products. Also, various veterinarians helped care for affected pets.
- The mayor of Villa el Salvador, Kevin Yñigo, came to the affected area to obtain data on the damage caused, where he stated, in reference to the poor state of the road, that the work had been executed in the previous management. However, he retired quickly.
- The mayor of Lima, Jorge Muñoz Wells, arrived at night in the affected area, where he declared that "the cistern was not conditions to transport gas." Later, on Twitter he sent condolences to the families of the deceased.
- On Facebook, the Safety Check tool was activated during the emergency.
- The cumbia group Armonía 10 canceled the concert scheduled in that district and encouraged citizens to support blood donations.
