= Lesnoy, Ryazan Oblast =

Lesnoy Лесной
- Urban-type settlement
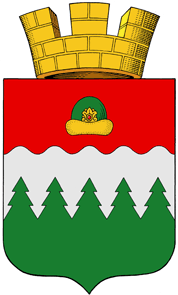
- Coat of arms
- Interactive map of Lesnoy
- Location of Lesnoy Lesnoy (Ryazan Oblast)
- Coordinates: 54.2124°N 40.4667°E
- Country: Russia
- Federal subject: Ryazan Oblast
- Administrative district: Shilovsky District

Population (2010 Census)
  - Total: 7,632
  - Estimate (2023): 7,609 (−0.3%)
- Time zone: UTC+3 (MSK)
- Postal code: 391539
- OKTMO ID: 61658157051

Lesnoy (Russian: Лесно́й) is an urban locality (an urban-type settlement) in Shilovsky District of Ryazan Oblast, Russia. Population: 7,632 (2010 census); 7,522 (2002 census); 8,937 (1989 Soviet census).
