= 2013 Qingdao oil pipeline explosion =

2013 disaster in Qingdao, China

Coordinates: 36.0494°N 120.2150°E

- Location Shandong in China
- Date: 22 November 2013
- Location: Qingdao, Shandong, China
- Deaths: 62
- Suspects: 9

The 2013 Qingdao oil pipeline explosion occurred on 22 November 2013, when an oil pipeline in Chinese city of Qingdao, Shandong Province, China leaked and caught fire and exploded. The blast killed at least 62 people. At least nine people were detained by the police.

== Explosion ==
The pipeline leaked for about 15 minutes before it was shut off, spilling oil onto the street and into the sea. Hours later, while cleanup was underway, the oil ignited and exploded in two places. Investigators said oil had seeped into underground utility pipes, which may have contributed to the blasts. Some of the spilled oil also caught fire as it spread across the water.

== Findings ==
Rapid urban expansion brought pipelines closer to the public, creating risks and opportunities for theft. There’s no national pipeline database, and investigations have been called ineffective. A Sinopec safety review found 8,000 issues across its sites. A national check later revealed widespread corrosion in pipelines.
