= Tidewater grain elevator explosion =

1956 incident in Philadelphia, Pennsylvania, U.S.

- Date: 28 March 1956
- Location: Philadelphia
- Type: Explosion
- Deaths: 20
- Injuries: 84

On March 28, 1956, the Tidewater Grain Company's grain elevator exploded in Philadelphia shortly after 8 PM, killing 20 and injuring at least 84 others.

The mill was at the corner of 31st and Market Street, near the main post office and train station. The new building of the Philadelphia Bulletin, across the street from the blast, was severely damaged, but the newspaper came out on schedule nevertheless.

Classes at nearby Drexel University were canceled the next day, as at least 25 Drexel students at evening classes had been injured when the windows blew out, and others when the stained glass in the ceiling of the main building shattered and rained down in the Great Court. The Great Court chandelier was taken down for repairs but was lost and had to be replaced by a replica. Drexel later bought the site of the explosion; as of 2025, it was the University City satellite campus of Lincoln University.

Later that year, five insurance companies filed suit against Tidewater to recover $350,000 they paid to Drexel.

The Tidewater executives had been summoned to court for fire code violations twice that year, most recently on March 21.
