= 2009 Chongqing mine blast =

Gas explosion in a coal mine

Coordinates: 29.413°N 106.55°E

- Date: May 30, 2009
- Time: 11 am
- Location: Qijiang County, Chongqing, China
- Cause: excessive amount of explosives
- Deaths: 30
- Injuries: 59
- Arrests: 3

A gas explosion occurred at a coal mine in Southwestern China in Qijiang County, Chongqing, on May 30, 2009.

== Explosion ==
The explosion happened on 30 May 2009 around 11 a.m. at Tonghua Coal Mine in Qijiang County, when 131 miners were working underground. The Tonghua mine was affiliated with the state-owned Songzao Mining Bureau of Chongqing. The death toll reached 30 people and 101 miners were rescued, according to state media. Of those rescued, 59 were injured, including four in serious condition.

The cause of the blast was an illegal practice which violated mining rules, and an excessive amount of explosives directly triggered the accident.

Police detained three people: the owner of the coal mine, chief engineer, and project manager.

== See also ==
- Coal power in China
