= 2012 Astrakhan gas explosion =

Gas explosion in Astrakhan, Russia

- Location of Astrakhan Oblast in Russia
- Date: 27 February 2012
- Location: Astrakhan, Astrakhan Oblast, Russia; 46°20′09.02″N 48°03′55.67″E
- Cause: gas explosion
- Deaths: 10
- Injuries: 12

The 2012 Astrakhan gas explosion occurred on February 27, 2012, at an apartment building in the city of Astrakhan, Astrakhan Oblast, Russia. It was caused by a natural gas explosion. Anzhelika Barinova of Russia's Emergency Situations Ministry says another five people are missing after Monday's explosion in Astrakhan, 1,300 kilometers (800 miles) southeast of Moscow. The blast killed at least 10 people and injured 12.

== Explosion ==
A nine-story apartment block collapsed after a gas explosion. The rescuers battled to find up to 14 people still feared trapped under the rubble.
