= 2017 Kalynivka ammunition depot explosion =

Sabotage incident

Coordinates: 49°26′50″N 28°31′23″E

The ammunition depot at Kalynivka, near Vinnytsia, Ukraine, underwent a series of multi-kiloton explosions that started on the evening of September 26, 2017 and continued burning until September 30. In 2021 the Prosecutor General announced that evidence confirmed sabotage.

The Kalynivka ammunition depot is one of the largest arsenals of the Ukrainian military.

== Events ==
According to the Defense Minister, Stepan Poltorak, about 83,000 tons of ammunitions were stored at the site, about 63,000 tons of it usable consisting primarily of tank ammunition. The explosions forced the temporary evacuation of about 24,000 or 30,000 people. Air space was closed and trains diverted. There was damage to property in the area but no fatalities were reported.

The cause of the explosions remained unclear, however, Ukraine's domestic intelligence believed the explosions to be an act of sabotage, and a presidential advisor suggested that a drone may have started it. The secretary of the Ukrainian Security and Defense Council, Oleksandr Turchynov, noted that the military arsenals have many safety violations. Prime Minister Volodymyr Groysman indicated the need for a thorough investigation and opined "This is the arsenal of the Ukrainian army, and I think it was no accident that it was destroyed."

Ukraine's State Emergency Service reported on September 30 that "uncontrolled explosions" and the fire had been halted.

On October 2 Kalynivka's schools resumed their school year.

The Kalynivka ammunition explosion was the second major explosion in 2017 of a Ukrainian ammunition depot. The earlier one took place in March at a depot at Balakliia near Kharkiv necessitating the evacuation of about 20,000 people. The destruction at these two ammunition depots is reported to have reduced the combat capability of the Armed Forces of Ukraine.
