= Isioma =

Isiọma
- Gender: Female
- Language: Igbo

Origin
- Origin: Igbo
- Meaning: Good luck
- Region of origin: Igboland

Other names
- Short form: Ọma

Isiọma // is a feminine given name of Igbo origins from Nigeria. It means "good luck".

== Notable people with the name ==
- Dreamer Isioma, Nigerian-American musician
- Isioma Daniel, Nigerian journalist
