= 2008 Ijegun pipeline explosion =

On 15 May 2008, a pipeline explosion occurred in the community of Ijegun, a suburb north of Lagos, Nigeria. The explosion took place after a bulldozer struck an oil pipeline. The Lagos police have stated that the explosion appears to be an accident, and not the work of thieves, as in past pipeline explosions near Lagos. Construction workers accidentally broke an underground pipeline from which fuel started to spill out; moments later an explosion occurred.

The fire started from the Isolo end of Ijegun, which spread to surrounding homes and schools. It reportedly spread through buildings with occupants inside. The Ijegun Primary School was also damaged. More than 15 homes and more than 20 vehicles were burned in the fire. Firefighters and volunteers used sand and water in attempts to extinguish the fires. Forty minutes after the fire started, NNPC (Nigerian National Petroleum Corporation) firefighters arrived on the scene. The Lagos State Fire Service later arrived.

Previous pipeline explosions in Nigeria
City	Date	Casualties
Lagos	26 December 2007	at least 40
Lagos	26 December 2006	at least 260
Lagos	12 May 2006	at least 150
Lagos	December 2004	at least 20
Lagos	September 2004	at least 60
Abia	June 2003	at least 105
Warri	July 2000	at least 300
Abia	March 2000	at least 50
Jesse	October 1998	at least 200

== Deaths ==
Although the Nigerian Emergency Management Agency initially said 10 people were killed, the Nigerian Red Cross claims at least 100 people have died. Other accounts state that the number dead is 39, including school children. AllAfrica.com reports that the death toll is up to 43. The bodies were taken to the Ikeja General Hospital. A pregnant woman and her 4-year-old son were also among the dead. The Nigerian Red Cross compiled names of the deceased and injured. They set up camps near the disaster as well. Local council and government officials claim that the actual death toll is much lower than what the Nigerian Red Cross is claiming. Victims were taken to a hospital and are said to have been suffering from serious burns.

It's believed that when the explosion occurred, gate men at the Ijegun Primary School initially locked the gates apparently to prevent the pupils from running into danger. But when the atmosphere became tense, the gate men and other staff were said to have run for their lives leaving everyone to their fate.

At that point, students from Ijegun Comprehensive School who ran into the primary school premises were said to have jointly brought down the wall of the school to facilitate their escape. Most of them were trampled on. Eight out of sixteen pupils who were rushed to Corner Stone Hospital reportedly died on 15 May and another died a day later. Three residents were killed after being run over by vehicles whose drivers attempted to flee the fire zone.

== See also ==
- 2006 Abule Egba pipeline explosion
- 2006 Atlas Creek pipeline explosion
- List of pipeline accidents
