= Santa Rosa de Lima Cartel =

Mexican criminal organization in Guanajuato State

- Cártel de Santa Rosa de Lima
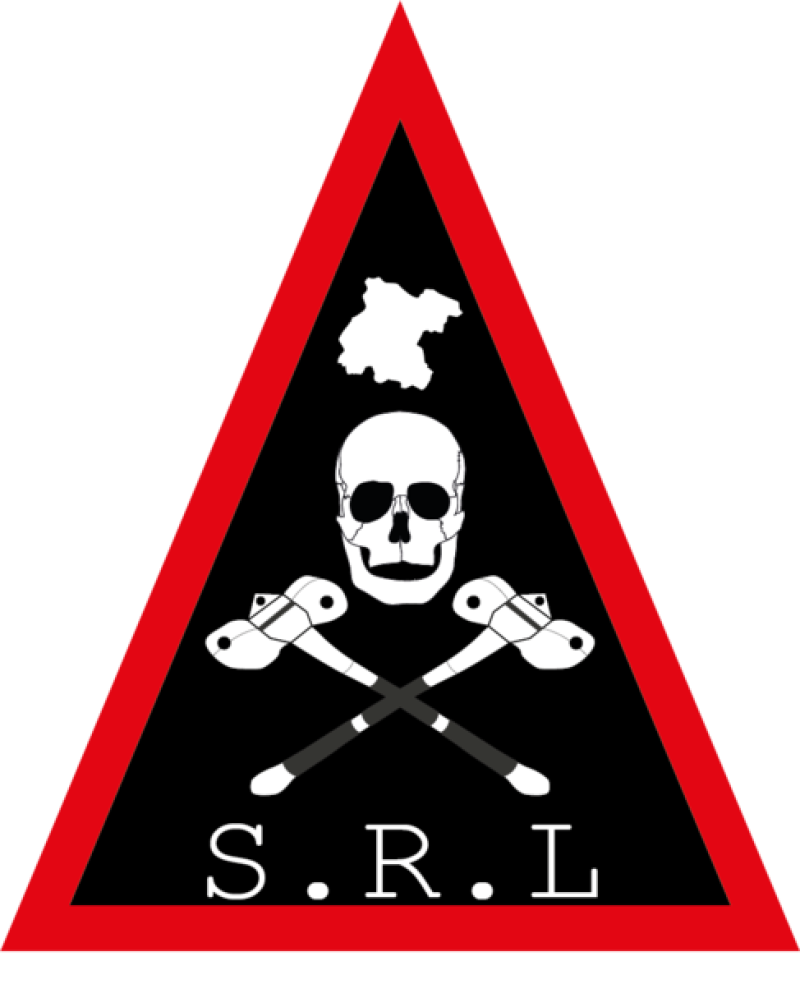
- Logo of the cartel used in their communications
- Founded: 2014
- Founded by: David Rogel Figueroa (alias “El Güero”) and José Antonio Yépez Ortiz (alias "El Marro")
- Named after: Santa Rosa de Lima
- Founding location: Santa Rosa de Lima, Guanajuato, Mexico
- Years active: 2014−present
- Territory: Guanajuato, Hidalgo, Querétaro and Northern Michoacan
- Ethnicity: Mexican
- Membership: 200 (2016-17)
- Criminal activities: Drug trafficking, money laundering, oil theft, extortion, robbery, murder, arms trafficking
- Allies: Gulf Cartel; Grupo Escorpión
- Rivals: Los Zetas; Jalisco New Generation Cartel

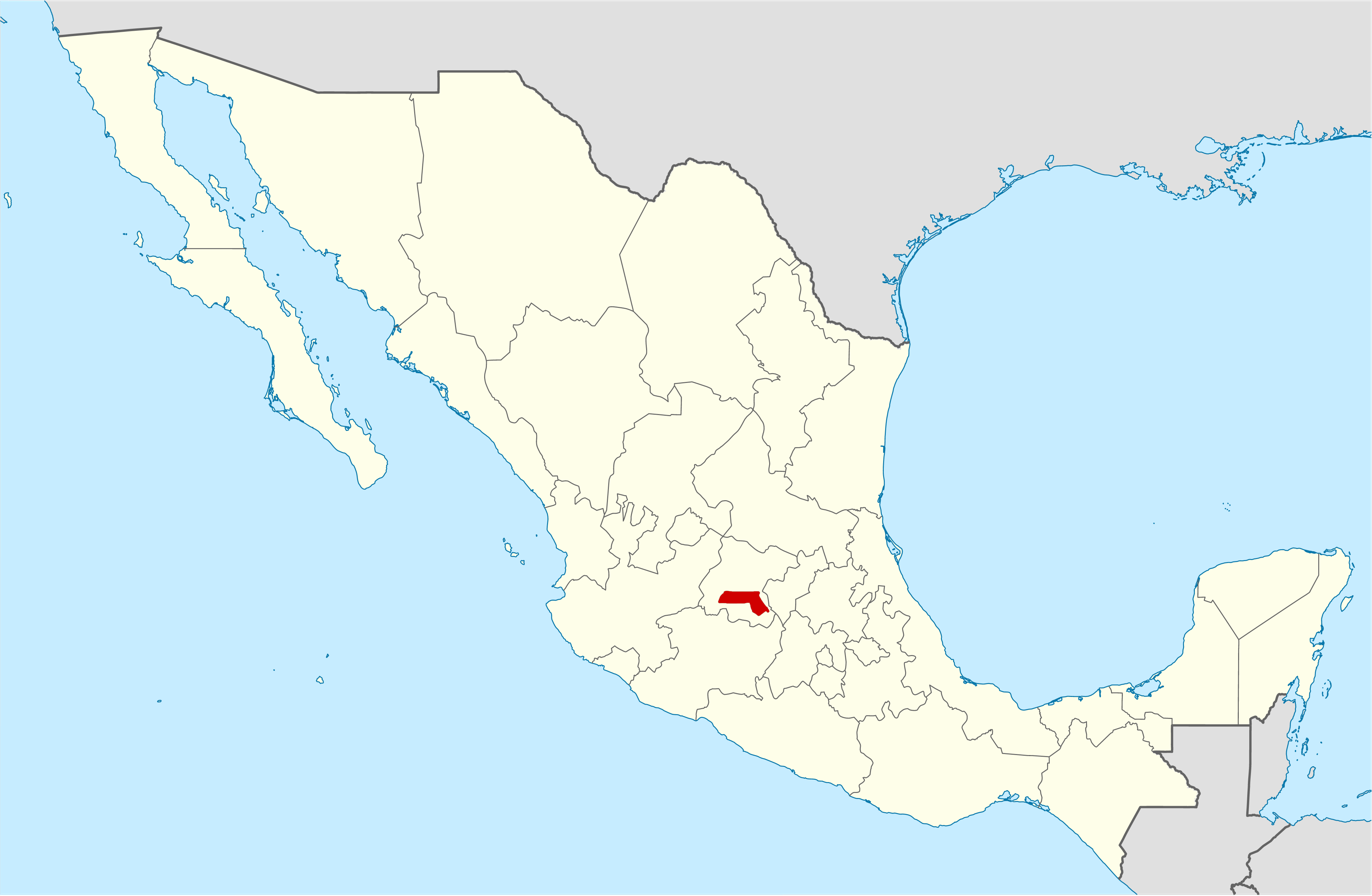
Presence in Guanajuato

The Santa Rosa de Lima Cartel (Spanish: Cártel de Santa Rosa de Lima) or CSRL is a minor Mexican criminal organization, based in the state of Guanajuato. The cartel focuses and mainly earns income from local oil theft.

The cartel was founded some time in 2014, in the regional aftermath of the collapse of the Beltrán-Leyva Organization. The CSRL maintained a low profile until around 2017, when it began a war with the Jalisco New Generation Cartel (CJNG).

By June 2020, reports indicated that repeated raids by state police and its turf war with the CJNG resulted in the CSRL losing much of their territories in the states Guanajuato, Querétaro and Hidalgo, as well as the majority of their members. However, remaining cartel members still maintain a presence in certain towns and municipalities of Guanajuato.

Following the arrest of cartel leader José Antonio Yépez Ortiz (“El Marro”) on 2 August 2020, the cartel’s leadership structure and memberships are unknown.

== History ==
=== Founding and early operations ===
The cartel was founded in the town of Santa Rosa de Lima, located in the municipality of Villagrán, Guanajuato sometime around 2014 by David Rogel Figueroa (“El Güero”), a state native and former Chiapas State Police officer who had become an operator for Los Zetas around a year prior. Rogel Figueroa led and expanded the CSRL throughout Guanajuato, eventually expanding into the neighboring states of Querétaro and Michoacán.

The main method that the cartel generated profits from was fuel theft (locally known as huachicol), by tapping pipelines in the region that connected to Pemex’s Antonio M. Amor Refinery in Salamanca; Pemex registered 1,696 pipeline taps attributed to the CSRL during 2017. Others activities included running extortion rackets against small and medium-sized entrepreneurs in major cities such as Celaya, Irapuato and Salamanca.

By 2016, Rogel Figueroa disappeared from Mexican military intelligence and from mentions in the CSRL; it is assumed that he had either died at this time or had been imprisoned under a fake identity.

In 2017, social media posts would proclaim that José Antonio Yépez Ortiz (“El Marro”) was the new leader of the CSRL. At the same time, Yépez Ortiz would threaten the Jalisco New Generation Cartel (CJNG), believing they were encroaching on his territory. Yépez Ortiz would later expand the CSRL’s criminal enterprises to include kidnapping, drug-dealing, and vehicle theft, in order to pay for the war with the CJNG.

The subsequent war between the CSRL and CJNG became one of the most intense theaters of the Mexican Drug War, with deaths related to the conflict contributing to Guanajuato becoming the deadliest Mexican state by 2019.

On 3 March 2019, at the behest of then-President Andrés Manuel López Obrador, Guanajuato state authorities, supported by federal law forces, launched Operation Golpe de Timón (English: “Change of Course”), aimed at dismantling the CSRL and suppressing increasing violence in the region caused by the war. By 20 March, 42 suspected cartel members were detained, in addition to the recovery of 100 stolen vehicles and the searching of 25 properties.

On 9 March 2019, a group of armed individuals committed a mass shooting at La Playa Men's Club, a nightclub in Salamanca. 15 people were killed and between 7 to 9 others were injured; investigators later stated that 14 of the 15 deceased individuals were CJNG members. The attack was linked to extortion demands for cobro de piso (a protection fee paid to cartels in order to gain the "right" to operate in their area). Witnesses described the attackers as a group of armed men affiliated with CJNG who arrived in three vans. Previously the owner of the place had received threats from CJNG for payment of the cobro de piso fee.

On 11 January, 2020, a CJNG sicario squad ambushed a wedding at a church in Pelavacas, Guanajuato, believing that Yépez Ortiz was present. Yépez Ortiz’ sister and bride-to-be, Karem Elizabeth Yépez Ortiz, was killed alongside her husband-to-be, an alleged CSRL member; Yépez Ortiz was not present, having left the church earlier in the ceremony.

On 29 January 2020, five suspected members of the CSRL were arrested and multiple weapons were seized by Mexican authorities at a safehouse in Celaya; one of the detained suspects, Karine “N” Mora, would identify herself as Yépez Ortiz’ wife, and was later released.

On 6 March, 2020, Yépez Ortiz’ father was arrested in Celaya by Guanajuato state and Mexican federal authorities.

In June of 2020, Yépez Ortiz’ mother and sister, alongside 30 other suspected CSRL members were arrested in concurrent operations. Yépez Ortiz would release a video to social media lamenting the arrests of his family members, although both his mother and sister would be released several days later.

On the evening of 1 July, 2020, a group of three armed individuals committed a mass shooting at a drug rehabilitation center in Irapuato, killing 24 people; the Guanajuato State Prosecutor’s Office would later announce that the three suspects were members of a gang allied to the CSRL, and had carried out the shooting on the orders of Yépez Ortiz.

On 2 August, 2020, Yépez Ortiz was arrested by Guanajuato state and Mexican federal authorities in Celaya, alongside five other CSRL members. Yépez Ortiz was detained at the Federal Social Readaptation Center No. 1 Altiplano prison until 2024, when he was transferred to the Federal Social Readaptation Center No. 14 Durango prison in Goméz Palacio, Durango.

On 14 October, 2020, Mexican authorities captured Adán Ochoa (“El Azul”), the leader of the Cartel.

== Organization and criminal activities ==
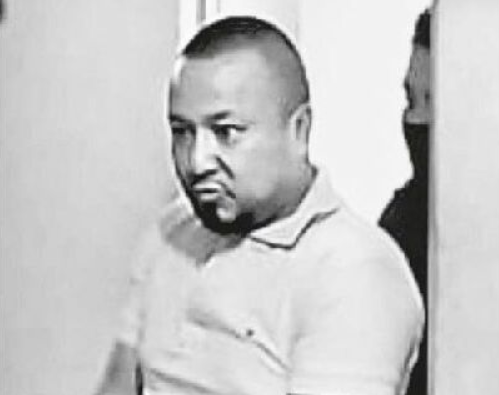
José Antonio Yépez Ortiz (leader 2017–20), photographed in 2022

Between 2017 and 2020, the cartel was commanded by José Antonio Yépez Ortiz, who had a nearby circle made up of 14 people including their families. Its financial operators are presumed to be the uncles of "El Marro", with Santiago "G" aka "Bachicha" the main operator. The authorities also identify Juan Manuel "A", Artemio "E" aka "El Temo", Eusebio "G" aka "El Titis", José Alejandro "J" among others.

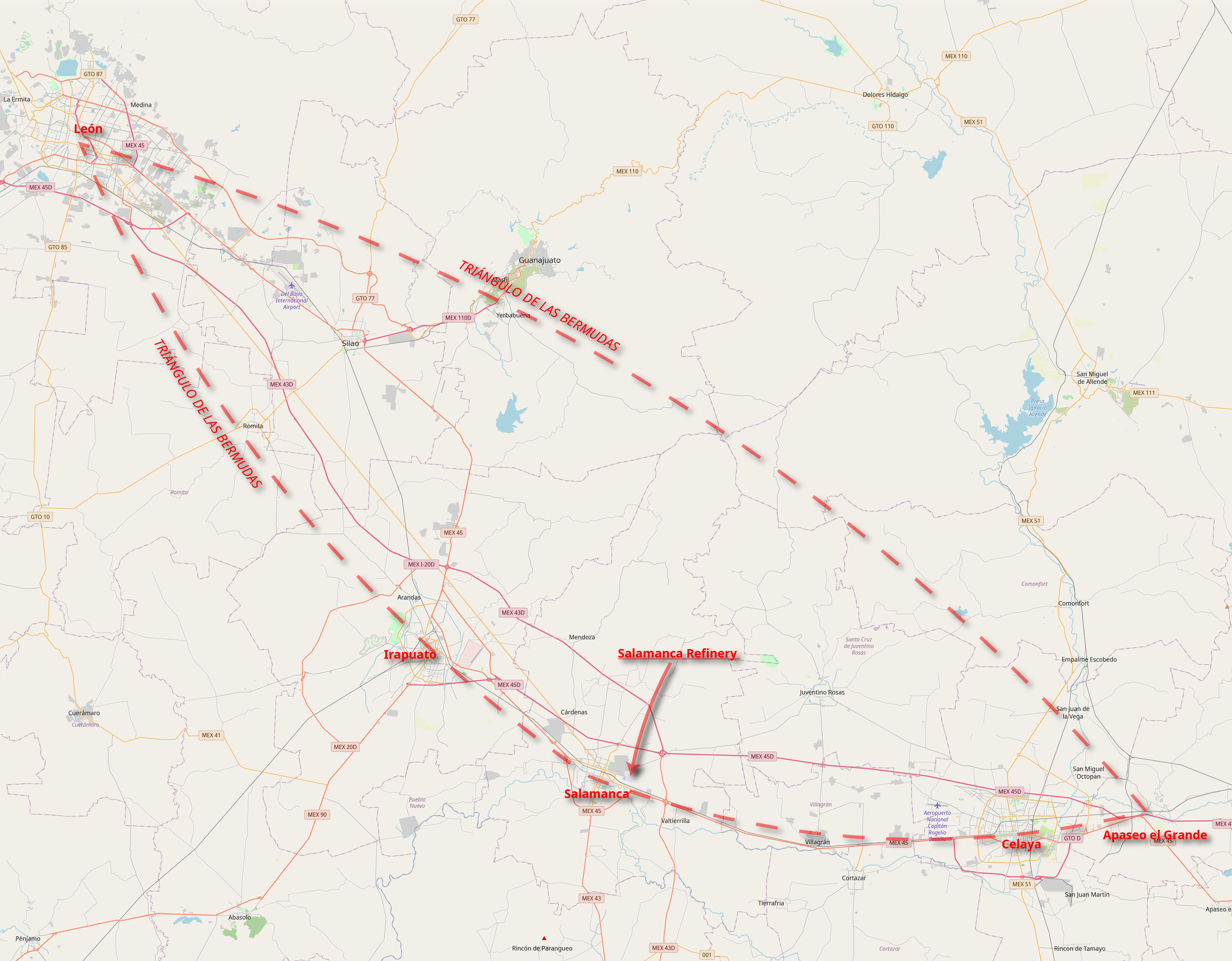
Map showing the cartel's main area of operation: the "Bermuda Triangle" region in Guanajuato and the location of the Salamanca refinery through which many of the oil pipelines siphoned off by the cartel depart.

The Santa Rosa de Lima cartel displayed their power against their rivals in 2017, such as when a video published through social networks shows El Marro, surrounded by more than a hundred armed men and a tactical team, challenges CJNG and other criminal organizations that operate in Guanajuato. After this announcement, a wave of violence was reported in the area, which even president Andrés Manuel López Obrador confirmed that, since his government started (on 1 December 2018), the state of Guanajuato was reported to be one of the most violent states in the country. The report states that more than 28,816 homicides were committed during 2018, which meant an increase of 15% compared to 2017 being the worst rate of the last 20 years, since the federal actions against criminal organizations began of the country in 2000.

The Santa Rosa de Lima Cartel is a major force behind the sale of methamphetamine in the state of Guanajuato. The cartel is infamous for selling meth that has a blue color, which they source from criminal groups in the state of Michoacán. According to local experts, there is little, if any, meth production in the state of Guanajuato.

On 29 October, Marco Antonio Flores Martínez, aka El Ñecas, was arrested. He planned to place a bomb on a plane, as well as detonate a Pemex pipeline in response to the operations that the government of Andrés Manuel López Obrador launched during the beginning of his government in December 2018 against the cartel.

The Santa Rosa de Lima Cartel was accused of another bomb attempt at the Pemex refinery in Salamanca, Guanajuato on 25 June 2020, after several of the cartel's leaders were arrested five days earlier.

Despite territorial losses to the CJNG, the CSRL still operates in Celaya, Irapuato, Salamanca, Salvatierra, Santa Rosa de Lima, Juventino Rosas, Apaseo el Alto, Apaseo el Grande, San Miguel Octopan, and Cortazar.

== Decline ==
On 11 June 2020, Óscar Balderas, a Mexican journalist and expert in organized crime, revealed to Insight Crime journalist Victoria Dittmar that government crackdowns and a turf war with the rival Jalisco New Generation Cartel (CJNG) resulted in the Santa Rosa de Lima Cartel losing a significant amount of land in Querétaro, Hidalgo and even their native state of Guanajuanto. According to Balderas, “The most recent outbreaks of violence have been the execution of the last soldiers [of the CSRL].” However, some Santa Rosa de Lima Cartel members still remain in certain municipalities of Guanajuato, such as Villagrán. However, the area was not known for still being active in organized crime.

On 22 June 2020, it was reported that Santa Rosa de Lima Cartel leader José Antonio “El Marro” Yépez's mother María Ortiz, sister Juana “N,” and cousin Rosalba “N,” were among the 26 Santa de Lima Cartel members arrested in Celaya, Guanajuato on 20 June. María Ortiz, who was a financier for the cartel, had more than 2 million pesos (US $89,500) on her when she was detained as well as approximately one kilogram of a substance believed to be methamphetamine. Those arrested had arrived to receive their weekly payroll. The newspaper Milenio confirmed that in addition to these 26 arrests, at least four other people with links to the Santa Rosa de Lima Cartel were arrested after raids on properties near the border between Celaya and Villagrán, the municipality where the criminal organization has been based. However, El Marro managed to escape the Celaya raid and afterwards posted at least two social media videos, one where he thanked people who set tire fires so he could escape arrest and another where he decided to consider entering into an alliance with the Sinaloa Cartel following the arrest of his mother. On 23 June, it was revealed that the CJNG had sent assassins to kill El Marro on many occasions, including at his sister's wedding earlier in the year. It was also revealed that with Santa de Lima Rosa Cartel's demise, the CJNG was struggling to gain influence in territory controlled by the Santa Rosa de Lima Cartel as well.

On 2 August 2020, El Marro, also known as "The Sledgehammer”, was captured in a joint operation between Guanajuato's state government and Mexico's Secretariat of Public Security. At least five other people were detained in the joint operation as well, and a businesswoman from Apaseo El Alto who had been kidnapped was rescued.

== See also ==
- List of Mexican cartels
