= Santa Rosa de Lima, Guanajuato =

Santa Rosa de Lima
- Location within Guanajuato
- Coordinates: 20°33′58″N 100°55′27″W
- Country: Mexico
- State: Guanajuato
- Municipality: Villagrán
- Elevation: 1,744 m (5,722 ft)

Population (2010)
  - Total: 2,727
- Time zone: UTC-6 (Zona Centro)

Santa Rosa commonly known as Santa Rosa de Lima is a town located in the municipality of Villagrán, in the Mexican state of Guanajuato.

== Location and demography ==
Santa Rosa de Lima is located in the northeast of the municipal territory of Villagrán, almost in the limits with the municipality of Celaya and the municipality of Santa Cruz de Juventino Rosas.

It is located approximately one kilometer south of the Mexican Federal Highway 45D, the main toll road in the region that leads to Celaya to the east and Salamanca to the west. It joins this highway by a dirt road and with a paved road that joins it with the municipal capital, Villagrán and Cortazar.

According to the Population and Housing Census conducted by the National Institute of Statistics and Geography in 2010, the total population of Santa Rosa de Lima is 2,727 inhabitants, of whom 1,312 are men and 1,415 are women.

== Other ==
Santa Rosa de Lima has gained national notoriety due to being the origin of the group called the Santa Rosa de Lima Cartel, dedicated to the illegal commercialization of stolen fuel from the pipelines of the state-owned Pemex, also known as huachicol.
