= 2006 Lagos pipeline explosion =

2006 Lagos pipeline explosion may refer to:

- The 2006 Atlas Creek pipeline explosion, which occurred on May 12
- The 2006 Abule Egba pipeline explosion, which occurred on December 26
