= José Antonio Yépez Ortiz =

Mexican drug trafficker

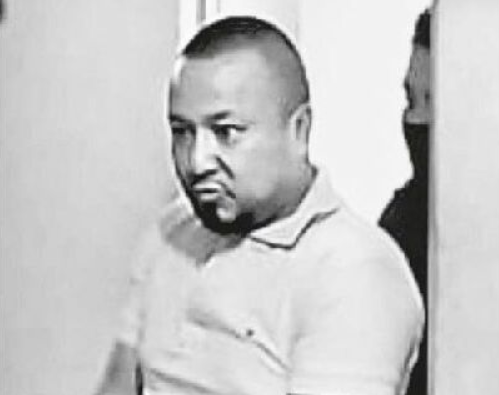
- José Antonio Yépez Ortiz during his imprisonment in the Federal Social Readaptation Center No. 1
- Born: July 23, 1980 (age 46); Santa Cruz de Juventino Rosas, Guanajuato, Mexico
- Other names: El Marro; The Sledgehammer
- Years active: 2010-2020
- Organization: Santa Rosa de Lima Cartel (suspected)
- Spouse: Karina Mora Villalobos
- Status: Incarcerated
- Allegiance: Gulf Cartel
- Criminal charges: Drug trafficking, murder, kidnapping, extorsion

José Antonio Yépez Ortiz, known as El Marro, The Sledgehammer or The Brown, is a Mexican suspected drug lord and huachicolero (fuel thief). Between 2017 and 2020, he served as the leader of the Santa Rosa de Lima Cartel (CSRL), a criminal group based in Guanajuato, Mexico. He was wanted by the Government of Mexico for his active participation in fuel theft. By June 2020, El Marro lost most of their "soldiers" and some territory but they still maintain presence in cities such as Celaya, Cortazar, Salamanca, Juventino Rosas, Santa Rosa de Lima, San Miguel Octopan, Villagrán, Apaseo El Alto and Apaseo El Grande. They are active in organized crime, This territory is also known as "El Triangulo de Las Bermudas". On 2 August 2020, El Marro was captured by state and federal authorities in Juventino Rosas, Guanajuato and was transported to the maximum security federal prison Federal Social Readaptation Center No. 1, also known as the "Altiplano".

== Career ==
El Marro began his criminal career in 2010, when he directed the transfer of drugs and theft of vehicles. Since January 2018, the Armed Forces initiated a search to find and capture him. Since February, The Navy has cornered him several times, but he has managed to escape law enforcement through various maneuvers including narcoblockades. In 2019, he formed an alliance with an armed wing of the Gulf Cartel called Special Forces Grupo Sombra to counter the Jalisco New Generation Cartel and to contest Guanajuato's plazas.

In July 2019, authorities froze more than $35 million from different accounts belonging to El Marro and the Santa Rosa de Lima Cartel. Authorities have also confirmed the desertion of some of Santa Rosa de Lima Cartel's main operators; 14 properties and 129 vehicles have been seized.

On June 11, 2020, Óscar Balderas, a Mexican journalist and expert in organized crime, revealed to Insight Crime journalist Victoria Dittmar that government and a turf war with the rival Jalisco New Generation Cartel (CJNG) resulted in the Santa Rosa de Lima Cartel losing a significant amount of land in Querétaro, Hidalgo and even their native state of Guanajuato. According to Balderas, “The most recent outbreaks of violence have been the execution of the last soldiers [of the CSRL].” However, some Santa Rosa de Lima Cartel members still remain in certain municipalities of Guanajuato, such as Villagrán. However, the area was not known for still being active in organized crime.

== Most recent events and capture ==
On June 22, 2020, it was reported that Santa Rosa de Lima Cartel leader José Antonio “El Marro” Yépez's mother María Ortiz, sister Juana “N,” and cousin Rosalba “N,” were among the 26 Santa de Lima Cartel members arrested in Celaya, Guanajuato on June 20, 2020. María Ortiz, who was a financier for the cartel, had more than 2 million pesos (US $89,500) on her when she was detained as well as approximately one kilogram of a substance believed to be methamphetamine. Those arrested had arrived to receive their weekly payroll. The newspaper Milenio confirmed that in addition to these 26 arrests, at least four other people with links to the Santa Rosa de Lima Cartel were arrested after raids on properties near the border between Celaya and Villagrán, the municipality where the criminal organization has been based. However, El Marro managed to escape the Celaya raid and afterwards posted at least two social media videos, one where he thanked people who sent tire fires so he could escape arrest and another where he decided to consider entering into an alliance with the Sinaloa Cartel following the arrest of his mother. On June 23, 2020, it was revealed that the CJNG had sent assassins to kill El Marro on many occasions, including at his sister's wedding earlier in the year. It was also revealed that the CJNG was struggling to gain influence in territory controlled by the Santa Rosa de Lima Cartel.

On August 2, 2020, El Marro was captured in a joint operation between Guanajuato's state government and Mexico's Secretariat of Public Security. At least five other people were detained in the joint operation as well, and a businesswoman who had been kidnapped was rescued.

On January 14, 2022, El Marro was convicted of aggravated kidnapping and sentenced to 60 years in prison.
