= Eduardo León Trauwitz =

Mexican politician

Brigadier General Eduardo León Trauwitz (born in Morelos) served as the head of security for Pemex, Mexico's state-run oil company, from 2012 to 2019. He is now a fugitive of justice, accused of masterminding a scheme to steal fuel from the Mexican government. He previously served as then-Governor Enrique Peña Nieto's personal bodyguard.

Trauwitz graduated from Mexico's Military College in 1986 with a degree in Military Administration. In 2010, he was promoted to a colonel. In November 2012, he was promoted again to the rank of brigadier general. In March 2014, President Peña Nieto appointed Trauwitz head of the new Strategic Safeguard Subdirectorate, putting him in charge of maintaining Pemex's physical security and rooting out huachicoleros. He led a force of 2,500 soldiers from Mexico's Army and Navy while annual fuel theft from pipelines increased from $19 billion pesos worth of fuel to $30 billion pesos.
