= Cap-Haïtien fuel tanker explosion =

December 2021 disaster in Haiti

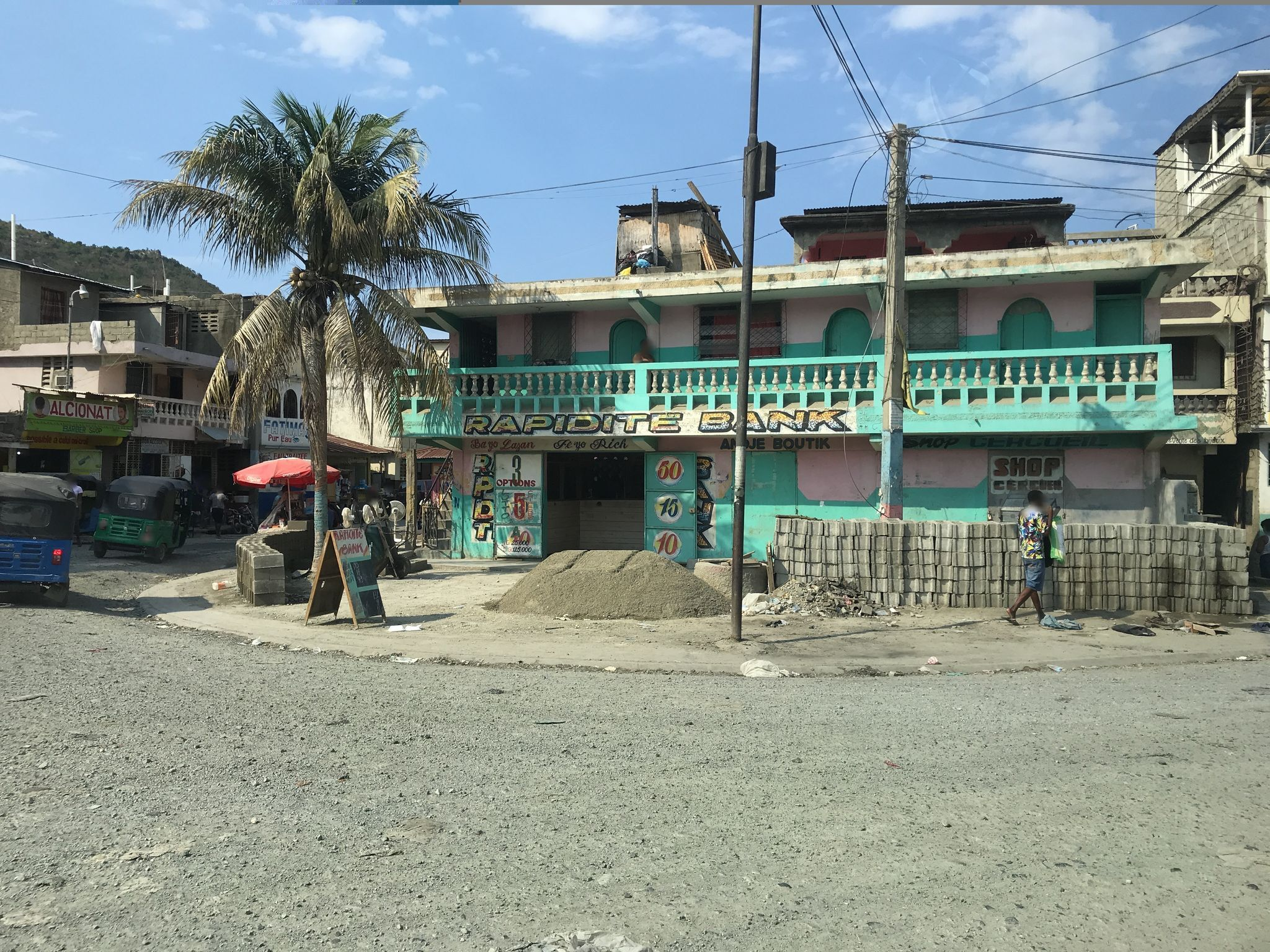
- Location where the explosion occurred, pictured in 2019.
- Date: 14 December 2021
- Time: c. 00:00 EST (UTC-5:00)
- Location: Samari, Cap-Haïtien, Haiti; 19°45′05″N 72°12′20″W
- Type: Fuel tanker explosion
- Cause: Smoldering trash
- Deaths: 90
- Injuries: 120+

On 14 December 2021, a fuel tank truck exploded in the Samari neighborhood of Cap-Haïtien, the capital city of the Haitian department of Nord. At least 90 people were killed and more than 120 were injured; many people were injured as a result of rushing towards the tanker, likely to collect some of its cargo, before the explosion occurred. Many inhabitants were suffering from financial crisis.

Haiti, hit with an economic crisis worsened by an earthquake four months earlier, was unable to adequately treat victims of the explosion, with hospitals undersupplied and in disarray.

== Background ==
In 2021, Haiti was the poorest country in the Western Hemisphere. Economic and political crises were compounded by the assassination of President Jovenel Moïse, and the 2021 Haiti earthquake which caused 2,248 deaths and US$1.5 billion in damage, and an unstable electrical grid that left hospitals, schools, and businesses dependent on gasoline generators. In the wake of the earthquake, looting and gang activity became rampant, stifling aid and recovery efforts. Gangs hijacked fuel trucks, kidnapped their drivers, and took control of fuel distribution ports.

In November 2021, G9 gang leader Jimmy Chérizier announced that fuel trucks would temporarily be allowed back into Port-au-Prince. Citizens of Haiti scrambled to get gasoline, with some selling to the black market.

== Explosion ==
A fuel tanker carrying 9,000 US gallons (34,000 L; 7,500 imp gal) of gasoline, in an attempt to avoid a motorbike, overturned and began spilling fuel. The driver of the truck exited the vehicle and warned bystanders not to approach. However some of the victims of the explosion had rushed forward after the initial crash. After it exploded fuel stored in nearby houses worsened the extent of the explosion.

The blast set 50 homes on fire, damaged businesses, and charred vehicles. The cause of the explosion was trash that was smoldering when gasoline from the truck reached it. Firefighters were dispatched to the area, but due to water shortages had to call in aid from airport fire services.

== Victims ==
Ninety people were killed in the explosion and more than 100 people were injured. After the explosion, several victims were injured due to trampling.

Ambulances took up to five hours to arrive, and 15 victims had to be airlifted. Victims were sent to smaller, less equipped hospitals because the largest hospital in the city had shut down in November, due to being attacked by bandits. These hospitals were overwhelmed and were unable to handle the victims, as they lacked basic supplies, with some victims being placed on the floor or the yard of the hospital due to the lack of hospital beds. Fourteen victims died while in the hospital.

== Aftermath ==
Field hospitals were also set up in the city. UNICEF sent medical equipment to the city for burn victims. Acting President and Prime Minister Ariel Henry announced three days of mourning in the country.

== See also ==
- Gasoline theft
- Tlahuelilpan pipeline explosion
