= 2014 GAIL pipeline explosion =

2014 underground gas pipeline explosion and fire in Nagaram, Andhra Pradesh, India

2014 GAIL Gas Pipeline Tragedy
- Date: 27 June 2014
- Time: 05:30 IST
- Location: Nagaram, East Godavari District, Andhra Pradesh, India; 16.501106°N 81.910726°E
- Cause: 18" Gas Pipeline rupture
- Deaths: 23
- Injuries: 38

On 27 June 2014, a massive fire broke out following a blast in Gas Authority of India Limited (GAIL) 18" size underground gas Pipeline at Nagaram in East Godavari district of Andhra Pradesh, India. The accident took place near Tatipaka refinery of Oil and Natural Gas Corporation (ONGC), about 180 km from state capital Vijayawada.

== Casualties ==
About 23 people were reportedly killed and around 40 injured in the accident. The injured were shifted to hospitals at Amalapuram and Kakinada towns.

== Explosion ==
State Finance Minister Yanamala Rama Krishnudu told reporters that 22 people were killed and many others were injured when the fire broke out around 5:30 a.m. in Nagaram village in Mamidikuduru Mandal of the coastal district. The minister said: "The fire caused massive losses. Coconut trees, other crops, cattle, and wild birds in over 10 acres were reduced to ashes."

== See also ==
- List of pipeline accidents
