= Abule Egba =

Neighbourhood in Lagos, Nigeria

Coordinates: 6.6480°N 3.3024°E

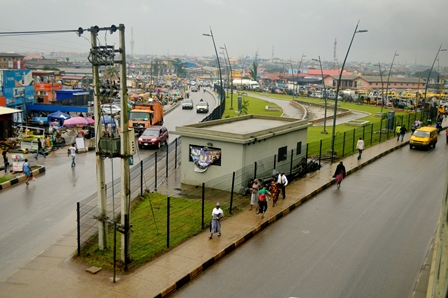
Abule-Egba Area

Abule Egba is a neighbourhood in Lagos, Nigeria. It is part of the Alimosho local government area of Lagos. The neighbourhood was the site of a petroleum pipeline explosion, the 2006 Abule Egba pipeline explosion, which occurred on 26 December 2006. In 2016, the Lagos Government began construction of a flyover in the neighbourhood to ease the traffic caused by millions of persons plying its road on a daily basis. The bridge was completed and commissioned in 17 May 2017 by the former governor of Lagos State, Mr. Akinwunmi Ambode.

== Gallery ==
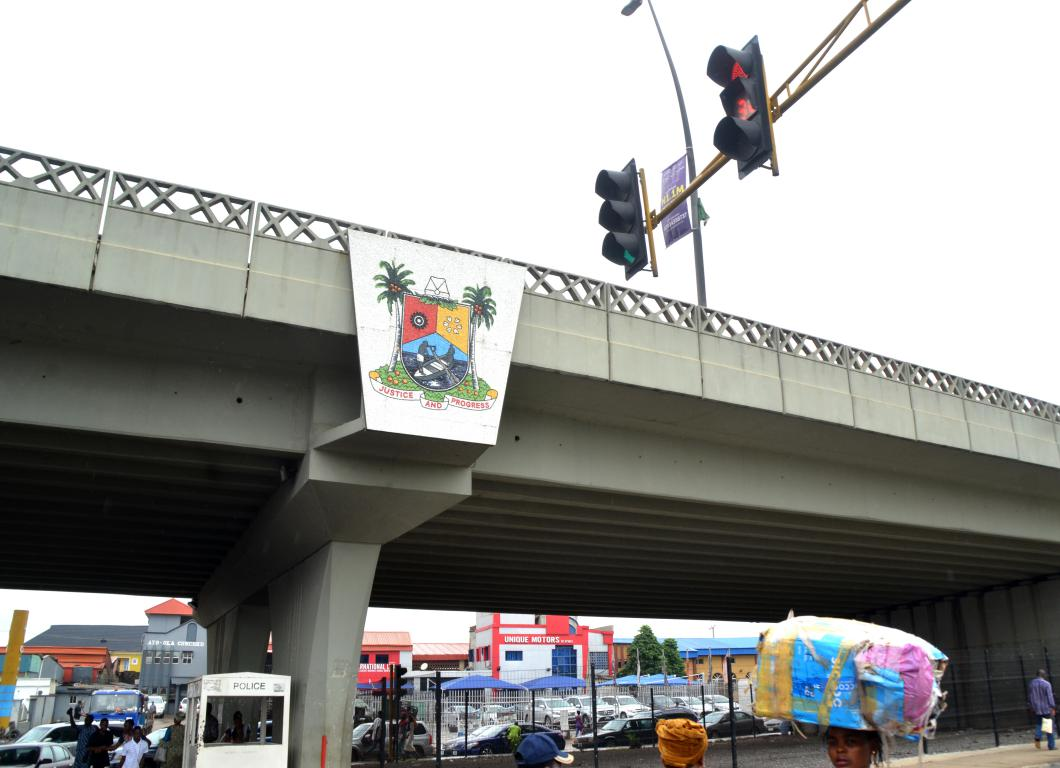

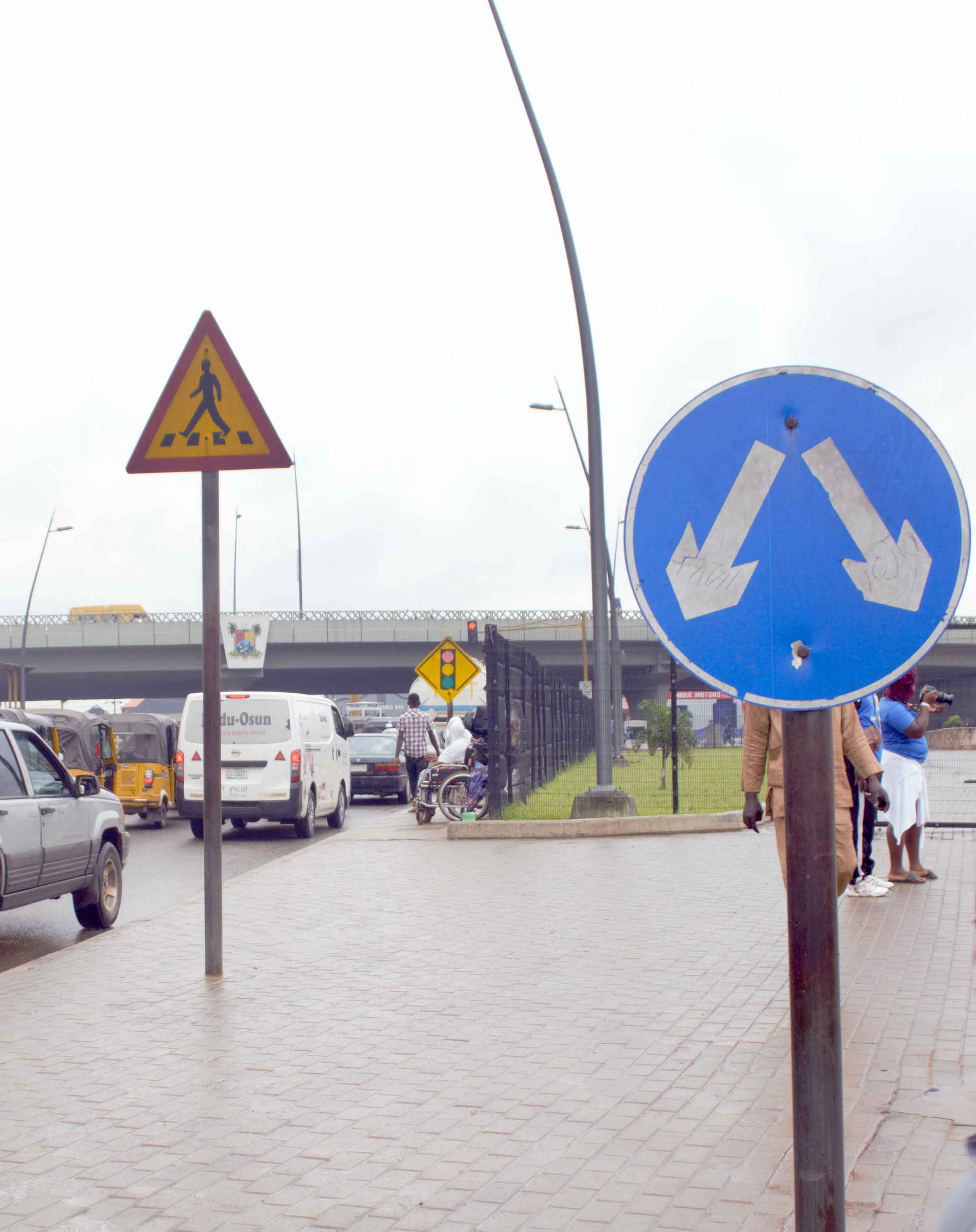

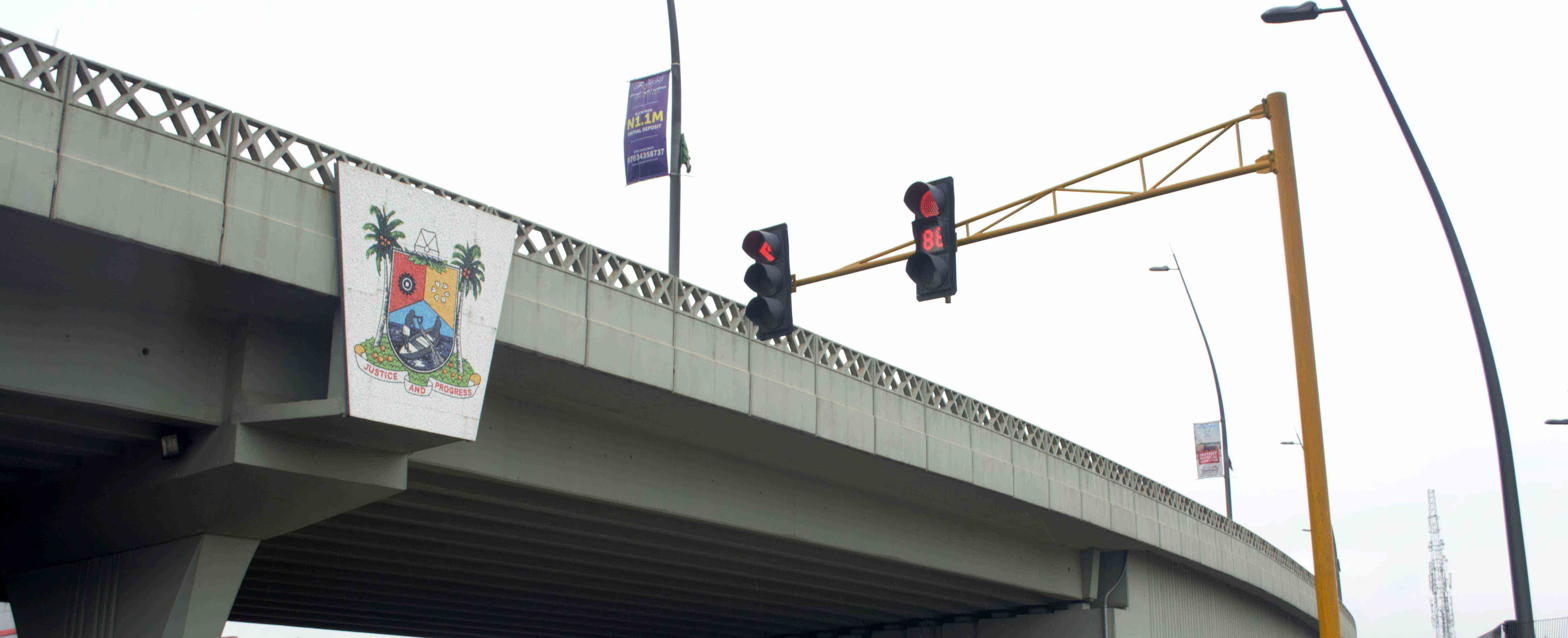

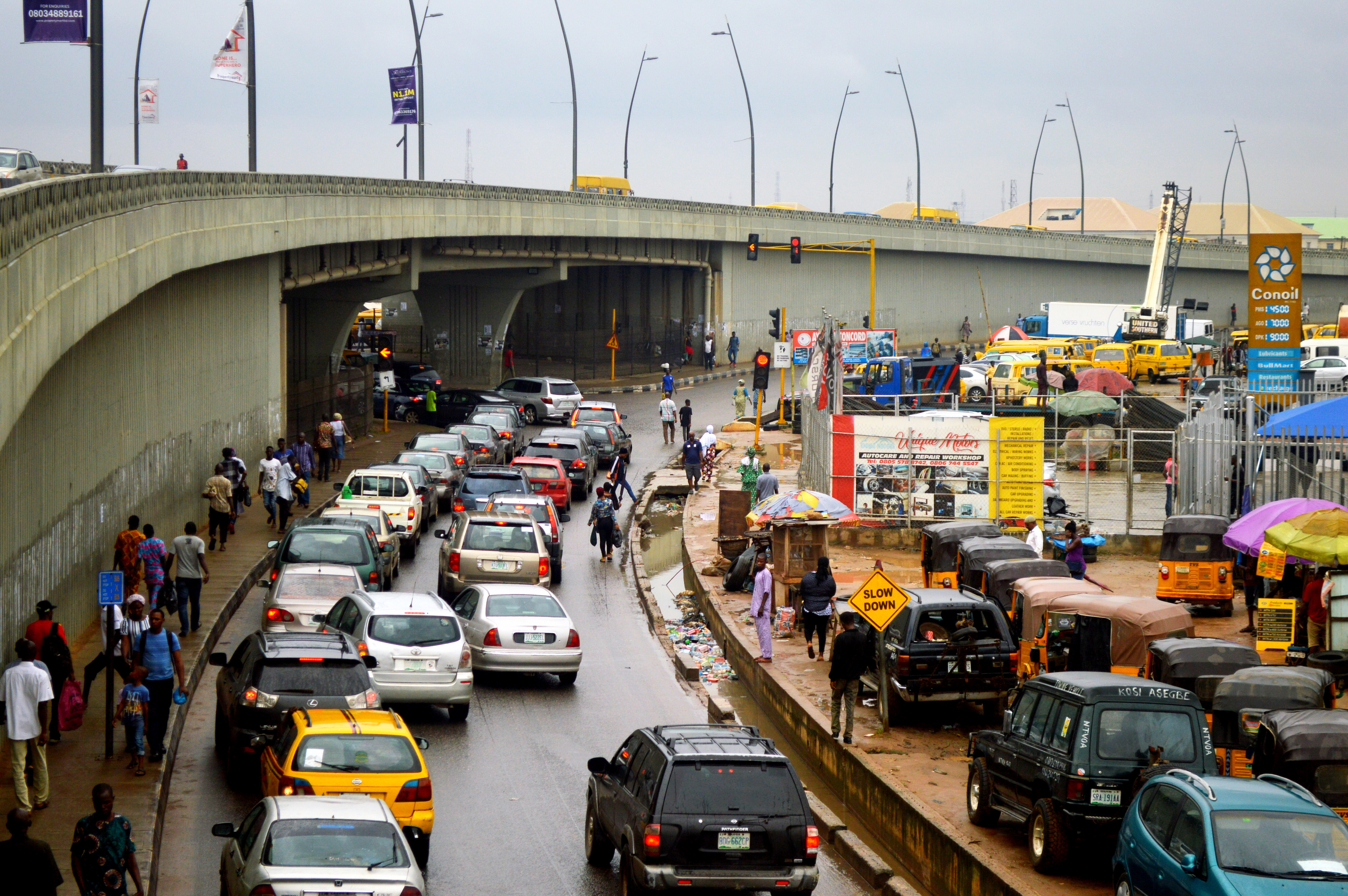
