= List of pipeline accidents =

The following is a worldwide list of pipeline accidents.

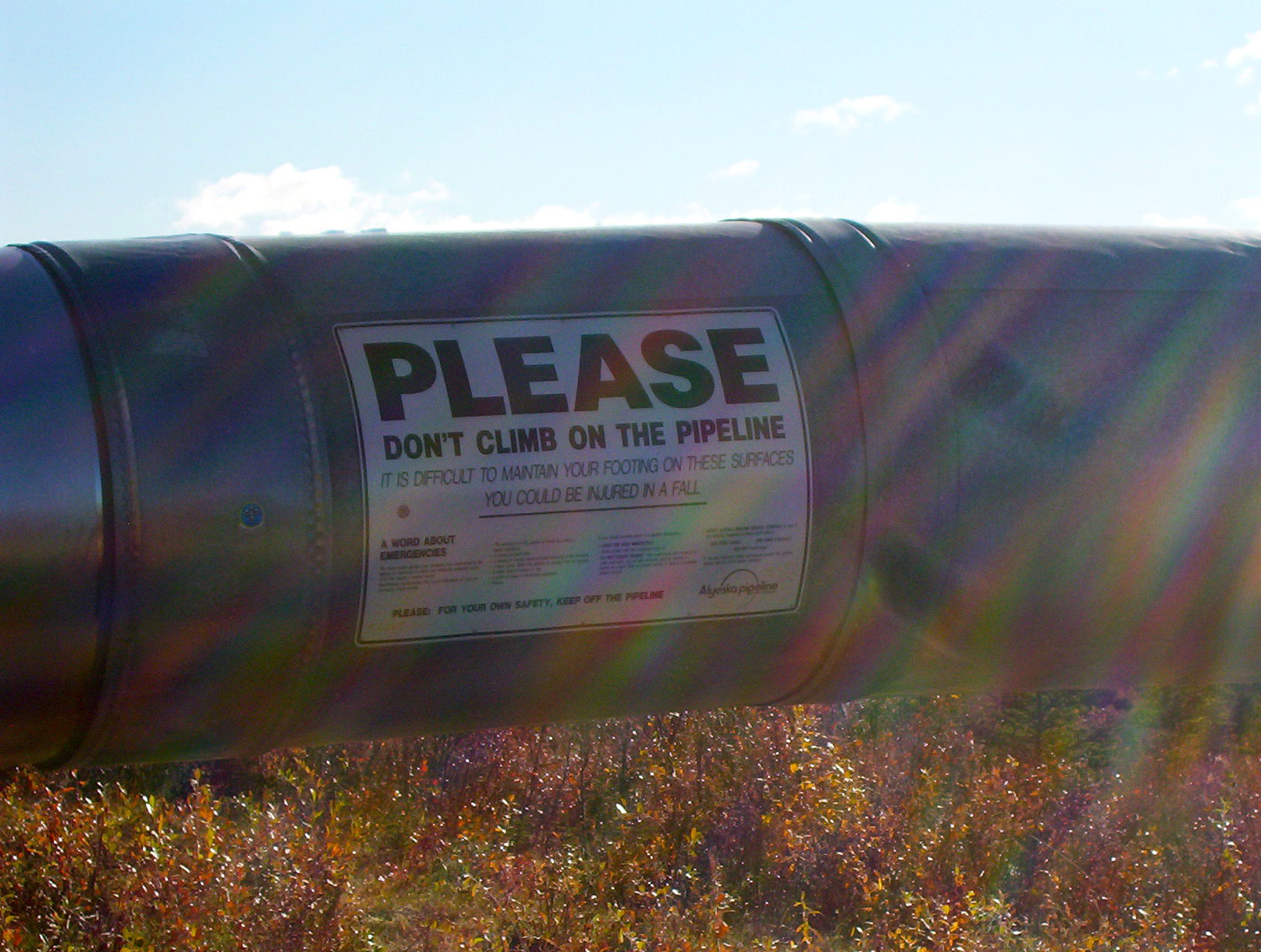

== Belgium ==
- 2004: A major natural gas pipeline exploded in Ghislenghien, Belgium near Ath (50 km [ 31 mi ] southwest of Brussels), killing 24 people and leaving 122 wounded, some critically on July 30, 2004.

== Canada ==
- A TransCanada pipeline ruptured and exploded in North Bay, Ontario, in the early 1960s and again in 1978.
- 1958: The Slater Street explosion: A massive explosion rocked the Centertown core of Ottawa at 8:17 am on Saturday, October 25, 1958. As an Ottawa Citizen reporter later described, the scene looked “just like a bombed area in wartime London.” The explosion occurred at the Addressograph Multigraph building at 248 Slater Street when natural gas seeped into an unused manufactured gas pipe system and into the building. A chemical reaction occurred. When a janitor turned on a light switch, the gas in the air exploded. Debris caused major traffic problems and 40 people were injured from flying glass fragments. 60 off-duty police and RCMP officers were called in to help police evacuate the area. William J. Anderson, the janitor at the Addressograph Multigraph building, died several days later from injuries sustained in the blast. Prime Minister John Diefenbaker came to the site to view the destruction. Over 25 businesses were closed indefinitely. Prince Philip arrived in Ottawa on October 31 to view the explosion site and question officials. Overall, the entire incident cost the government two million dollars in damages.
- 1962: An explosion on a gas pipeline occurred on a lateral line on January 17, about 50 km (31 mi) northwest of Edson, Alberta. 8 people were killed.
- 1965: An explosion from a gas line destroyed several apartments in the LaSalle Heights Disaster in LaSalle, Quebec killing 28 people, the worst pipeline disaster in Canadian history.
- 1965: On October 12, an explosion and fire involved the Albert Gas Trunk Line LTD., near Sundre, Alberta, killing 2 pipeline workers.
- 1969: On October 25, a faulty pipe exploded in a gas line beneath Malton, Ontario. One person died, about 20 were injured, 9 stores and several homes were destroyed. Gas in a dead end section of gas pipeline.
- 1985: On February 19, a ruptured Natural Gas Liquids pipeline caused a flash fire that burned 5 members of a pipeline repair crew, about 100 km (62 mi) from Edmonton, Alberta.
- 1986: On October 27, a butane pipeline was hit by a pipeline crew, in Sarnia, Ontario; 4 workers were injured (one critically).
- 1995: At 05:42 EST, on 29 July 1995, an initial rupture and a fire occurred on the TransCanada PipeLines Limited 1,067 mm (42.0 in) natural gas pipeline near Rapid City, Manitoba. At 06:34 EST, a second rupture and a fire occurred on the adjacent 914 mm (36.0 in) natural gas pipeline at the same location.
- 1996: On April 15, a rupture, followed by an explosion and fire at 18:29 EST, occurred on the TransCanada PipeLines Limited 864 mm (34.0 in) natural gas pipeline, at Kilometre Post Mainline Valve 39-2 + 6.07 km (3.77 mi), 10 km (6.2 mi) southwest of Winnipeg, near the town of St. Norbert, Manitoba.
- 1997: On April 30, a rupture occurred on the Westcoast Energy Inc. 219.1 mm (8.63 in) outside diameter Monias pipeline at Mile Post 20, near Fort St. John, British Columbia. Approximately 85,000 m^{3} (710,000 US barrels) of sour natural gas was released and ignited.
- 1997: On December 2, a rupture occurred at an area of external corrosion on the TransCanada PipeLines Limited 914 mm (36.0 in) outside diameter Line 100–3 at main line valve 5-3 + 15.049 km (9.351 mi), near Cabri, Saskatchewan. Approximately 3,252,000 m^{3} (114,800,000 cu ft) of natural gas was released as a result of the rupture. The gas ignited immediately, resulting in damage to the surrounding soil and vegetation. The main fire self-extinguished within 20 minutes of the line break.
- 1999: On May 20, Line 3 on the Enbridge Pipelines Inc. (Enbridge) pipeline system ruptured, releasing 3,123 m^{3} (26,190 US barrels) of Cold Lake heavy crude oil, east of Regina, Saskatchewan. Approximately 3.6 ha (8.9 acres) of farmland was affected by crude oil.
- 2000: On December 28, a release of natural gas resulted in an explosion that destroyed the electrical and services building, heavily damaged the compressor building, and damaged the remaining buildings at the East Hereford compressor station, approximately 80 km (50 mi) SE of Magog, Quebec. Before the occurrence, the station had been shut down due to an unintentional manual initiation of the station's emergency shutdown system. Following the emergency shutdown of the compressor station, a maintenance person was sent to the station to reinitiate the electric motor-driven compressor unit. During the day, after repeatedly trying to get the station into the ready state mode, to return the station to normal pipeline operations, an explosion occurred. The on-site maintenance person was seriously injured.
- 2001: On January 17, a rupture occurred on the Enbridge Pipelines Inc. 864-millimeter (34.0 in) outside diameter Line 3/4 at Mile Post 109.42, 800 m (870 yd) downstream of the Hardisty pump station near Hardisty, Alberta. The rupture occurred in a permanent slough that was fed by an underground spring. Although the line was shut down at the control centre in Edmonton, Alberta, within minutes of the rupture, the exact location of the rupture was not found until after 13 hours. Approximately 3,800 m^{3} (32,000 US barrels) of crude oil was released and contained within a 2.7-hectare (6.7-acre) section. As of 1 May 2001, 3,760 m^{3} (31,500 US barrels) of crude oil had been recovered.
- 2001: On September 29, a rupture occurred on the Enbridge Pipelines Inc. 508 mm (20.0 in) outside diameter Line 10 at Mile Post 1885.64, near Binbrook, Ontario. Line 10 transports crude oil from Westover, Ontario, to Buffalo, New York, United States. The rupture occurred in an agricultural field planted with soybeans. Within eight minutes of the rupture, the control center operator in Edmonton, Alberta, shut the line down and began to sectionalize it. Remedial action response teams contained the spill to two general areas, a natural swale running perpendicular to the pipeline and the pipeline trench. Approximately 95 m^{3} (800 US barrels) of crude oil were released, affecting a 0.67-hectare (1.7-acre) section of land.
- 2002: On April 14, a rupture occurred on the 914-millimeter (36.0 in)-diameter natural gas transmission pipeline, at a zone of near-neutral (low) pH stress corrosion cracking, on Line 100-3 of the TransCanada PipeLines, at main-line valve 31-3 + 5.539 km (3.442 mi), approximately 2 km (1.2 mi) from the village of Brookdale, Manitoba. Following the rupture, the sweet natural gas ignited. With the automatic closure of main-line valves upstream and downstream of the rupture site, the fire self-extinguished at 2:30AM, on 15 April 2002. There were no injuries. As a precautionary measure, approximately 100 people were evacuated from the occurrence area within a 4 km (2.5 mi) radius, including the village of Brookdale, for a period of one day.
- 2002: A refined product pipeline rupture near Saint-Clet, Quebec, on December 7, from Trans Northern Pipelines Inc. 273.1 millimetres (10.75 in) diameter mainline kilometer post 63.57, estimated 32 cubic metres (1,100 cu ft) of low sulphur diesel released to area and drainage systems.
- 2003: A backhoe punctured a pipeline in Etobicoke, Ontario, the resulting explosion killed 7 people.
- 2005: On July 15, an employee of Terasen Pipelines (Trans Mountain) Inc. discovered crude oil on the pipeline right-of-way, on the north side of Ward Road, Abbotsford, British Columbia. Before the discovery, the company had been delivering crude oil out of the Sumas Tank Farm, when it received odor complaints from local residents. Approximately 210 cubic meters (7,400 cu ft) of crude oil was released into the surrounding area and made its way into Kilgard Creek. There were no injuries.
- 2007: A crude oil pipeline owned and operated by Kinder Morgan Energy Partners was ruptured by an excavator digging a storm sewer trench in Burnaby, British Columbia.
- 2007: On 15 April, a rupture occurred on Enbridge Pipelines’ 864-millimeter (34.0 in) outside diameter Line 3 at Mile Post 506.2217 downstream of the Glenavon pump station near Glenavon, Saskatchewan. The rupture occurred in a wetland area of farmland. Approximately 990 cubic meters (35,000 cu ft) of crude oil were released, of which approximately 912 cubic meters (32,200 cu ft) were recovered. There were no injuries. The cause was determined to be corrosion cracking.
- 2007: On July 24, the 610-millimeter (24 in) Westridge Dock Transfer Line, owned by Trans Mountain Pipeline L.P. and operated by Kinder Morgan Canada Inc., was struck and punctured by a contractor's excavator bucket while the contractor was excavating a trench for a new storm sewer line along Inlet Drive in Burnaby, British Columbia. When the pipeline was punctured, approximately 234 cubic meters (8,300 cu ft) of crude oil were released, approximately 210 cubic meters (7,400 cu ft) of which was recovered. Crude oil flowed into Burrard Inlet Bay via the Burnaby storm sewer system. Eleven houses were sprayed with crude oil; many other residential properties required restoration, and approximately 250 residents voluntarily left their homes. There were no explosions, fires, or injuries. Emergency workers and two firefighters responding to the incident were sprayed with crude oil. Two members of the public were also sprayed.
- 2009: A July 20 Alberta pipeline explosion and fire involved a TransCanada Corporation natural gas pipeline. The explosion, which sent 50 meter flames into the air, destroyed a 2-hectare (4.9-acre) wooded area. The NEB said the delay in releasing the report was caused by an "administrative error" when an employee left without transferring the file over. The Peace River Mainline pipeline, built in 1968, had ruptured six times and leaked on 17 occasions until 2014. The line ruptured in 2009 due to corrosion.
- 2009: On 12 September, TransCanada Corporation's Gas Control received notification, from the Englehart Fire Department through its Emergency Notification Line, of an explosion and fire south of its Compressor Station 107, located near Swastika, Ontario. At the time of the occurrence, TransCanada was transporting sweet natural gas. Escaping gas from a pipeline rupture had ignited, resulting in the explosion. A large crater was created, and two sections of pipe broke from the system, with one section being ejected approximately 150 meters (5,900 in) from the rupture site. There were no injuries.
- 2009: On 26 September, TransCanada Corporation's Line 100-1 ruptured, near Marten River, Ontario. At 11:51, Gas Control at TransCanada's Calgary office became aware of this event when Main Line Valve 112–1, on the upstream side of Compressor Station 112, automatically shut off due to low pipeline pressure. At the time of the occurrence, TransCanada was transporting sweet natural gas. The escaping gas did not ignite. A large crater was created, and pipe pieces were ejected from the failed pipeline section and spread around the occurrence site. There were no injuries.
- 2009: On 29 September, an Enbridge crude oil pipeline, Line 2, leaked at Mile Post 474.7335, immediately downstream of the Odessa pump station near Odessa, Saskatchewan. The leak occurred at a crack within a shallow dent at the 6 o’clock position on the pipe. There were indications of gouging associated with the dent. The release occurred in a low-lying, densely vegetated marsh. Approximately 175 cubic meters (6,200 cu ft) of crude oil were released, of which most were recovered. There were no injuries.
- 2009: A refined product pipeline ruptured near Farran's Point, Ontario, on Ottawa Lateral, on October 5, from Trans Northern Pipelines Inc. system, unknown petroleum product, unknown quantity. Transportation Safety Board Report Number P09H0086.
- 2009: On November 22, a sour gas pipeline ruptured, near Pouce Coupe, British Columbia. Residents nearby first smelled gas at 2:30 am, but 911 was not called until 8:36 am. EnCana notified residents of the leak at 10:16 am.
- 2010: A refined product pipeline rupture at Bronte Creek in Oakville, Ontario, detected on March 11, from Trans Northern Pipeline Inc. system, estimated 23,770 US gallons (90,000 L; 19,790 imp gal) of gasoline released to creek, soil, and ground water. Transportation Safety Board Report Number P10H0021.
- 2011: On February 19, TransCanada PipeLines Limited's gas control operator received notification through its emergency notification line of a pipeline fire and explosion near Beardmore, Ontario. At the time of the occurrence, TransCanada was transporting sweet natural gas. Escaping gas from a pipeline rupture had ignited, resulting in the explosion. A large crater was created, and three pieces of pipe broke from the system, with pipe and other debris being ejected up to 100 m from the rupture site. Six residents near the site evacuated until the fire was extinguished. There were no injuries.
- 2011: In April, a pipeline break northeast of Peace River, Alberta, leaked 28,000 barrels of crude oil, Some wildlife was killed from the spill. The Energy Resources Conservation Board, an independent government agency that was dissolved in 2013, reprimanded the company, saying it had inadequate leak detection and failed to test its emergency response plan.
- 2011: On April 30, a leak on a pipeline carrying sour gas killed 1 worker, and injured another, near Fox Creek, Alberta.
- 2012: In June, almost 2,400 barrels of sour crude oil leaked into a creek that flows into the Red Deer River, located about 100 kilometres (62 mi) north of Calgary, near the community of Sundre.
- 2012: On June 19, an Enbridge pipeline had a gasket failure, spilling about 1,400 barrels of crude oil, at a pumping station near Elk Point, Alberta.
- 2012: On June 23, an ignition and fire occurred in a valve-enclosure structure at Spectra Energy Transmission Compressor Station N4, located approximately 160 km (99 mi) northwest of Fort St. John, British Columbia. Two maintenance employees sustained burn injuries when sweet natural gas that had been leaking from a station valve ignited. The 2 employees were performing annual inspection work on motor-operated valves. The injured employees were air-lifted to the Fort St. John Hospital. One employee was released later that day, while the second employee was transferred to a burn unit in Vancouver.
- 2012: On June 28, a pipeline rupture and ignition occurred on Westcoast Energy Inc.'s 16-inch (410 mm) Nig Creek pipeline, located about 40 km (25 mi) northwest of Buick, British Columbia. Approximately 25 minutes later, a pipeline rupture and ignition occurred on Bonavista Energy Corporation's 6.625-inch (168.3 mm) pipeline installed nearby in the same right-of-way. At the time of the ruptures, both pipelines had been shut down and contained pressurized sour gas. The fire spread to adjacent forested areas. A large crater was created, and one piece of the Nig Creek pipe was ejected along with other debris to approximately 20 m from the rupture site. There were no injuries and no evacuation was required.
- 2013: In June, between 400,000 and 600,000 litres (3,400 and 5,000 US bbl) of produced water escaped from a pipeline, in addition to 24 barrels of oil, near Little Buffalo, Alberta.
- 2013: On June 20, debris in river flood water broke a gas pipeline in Turner Valley, Alberta, releasing sour gas. 50 homes were evacuated in the area for a time. There were no injuries reported.
- 2013: On October 17, a 36-inch natural gas pipeline ruptured southwest of Fort McMurray, Alberta. An estimated 16.5 million cubic meters (580×10^{6} cu ft) of natural gas were released. The rupture did not result in a fire, there were no injuries and no evacuation was required. A fracture in a pipe elbow was the identified for the reason of the failure.
- 2014: On January 25, a TransCanada Corporation gas transmission pipeline 30-inch (760 mm) Line 400-1 exploded and burned, near Otterburne, Manitoba, causing a natural gas shortage in Manitoba and parts of the United States. Natural gas burned for approximately 12 hours. Five residences in the immediate vicinity were evacuated, and Provincial Highway 303 was closed until the fire was extinguished. There were no injuries.
- 2014: On April 2, a pipeline failed, and spilled 337 US barrels (40,200 L) of oil and processed water, northwest of Slave Lake, Alberta.
- 2014: In November, 60,000 liters (13,000 imp gal; 16,000 U.S. gal) of crude oil spilled into muskeg from a failed pipeline, in Red Earth Creek in northern Alberta. Officials were delayed in reaching the scene, due to poor weather at the time.
- 2015: On March 1, a pipeline leak spilled about 17,000 US barrels (2,000,000 L) of condensate, in Northern Alberta.
- 2015: On May 5, a gas transmission pipeline failed approximately 36 kilometres (22 mi) southeast of Drumheller, Alberta. The incident resulted in an undetermined volume of sweet natural gas and associated hydrocarbon liquid being released onto agricultural land.
- 2015: On July 15, a pipeline at a Long Lake oil sands facility in northern Alberta leaked about 31,500 barrels of oil emulsion. The spill covered approximately 16,000 square meters (4.0 acres) but was mostly contained within the pipeline's right of way.
- 2015: On August 14, a leak from a pipeline spilled about 100,000 liters (840 U.S. bbl) of an oil, water, and gas emulsion on the Hay Lake First Nation, about 100 kilometres (62 mi) northwest of High Level, Alberta.
- 2016: On July 21, a leaking Husky Energy pipeline spilled 1,890 US barrels (225,000 L) of oil into the North Saskatchewan River, prompting a massive cleanup.
- 2017: On February 17, a total of 962 barrels of oil condensate in Strathcona County, Alberta, were released from line 2A, near Anthony Henday Drive and 92 Avenue, after line was struck during 3rd party construction operations.
- 2018: On January 7, a butane oil pipeline ruptured in Saint John, New Brunswick. About 30 homes in the area were evacuated, as well as the SPCA Animal Rescue League Shelter.
- 2018: On May 27, a Trans Mountain pipeline leaked at the company's Darfield station north of Kamloops, British Columbia. About 23 barrels of crude were released.
- 2018: On October 9, a 36-inch Enbridge natural gas pipeline exploded 13 km (8.1 mi) north of Prince George, British Columbia. About 1 million BC customers and 750,000 US customers were affected. Natural gas customers were asked to reduce use.
- 2020: On June 13, a Trans Mountain pipeline leaked at the company's Sumas pumping station in Abbotsford, British Columbia. An estimated 1,600 US barrels (190,000 L) of crude were released.

== China ==
- 2010: Dalian Pipeline disaster – The explosion of two petroleum pipelines and subsequent fire in the port of Dalian, in northern China's Liaoning province on Saturday, on July 17, 2010, caused fatalities, damages and an ecological disaster, releasing 11,000 barrels of oil into the Yellow Sea, and covering up, according to different sources, from 50 to 430 km^{2} of sea and coast lines.
- 2013: a Sinopec Corp oil pipeline exploded in Huangdao, Qingdao, Shandong Province, on November 22, 2013. 55 people were killed.

== India ==
- 2014: On June 27, a pipeline blast in the Indian state of Andhra Pradesh killed 22 people and injured 37. The pipeline was operated by Gas Authority of India Limited (GAIL) and a preliminary investigation revealed faulty operational procedures as a cause of fire.
- 2017: On April 29, a fire broke out in a GAIL operated gas pipeline caused by civil construction operations.
- 2017: On June 17, a farm near city of Jamnagar was flooded with oil. An oil pipeline operated by Indian Oil Corporation Limited (IOCL) since 1999 was ruptured below 12 feet from the ground.

== Indonesia ==
- 2006: On Wednesday, October 18 a gas pipeline explosion killed at least seven people in East Java. The explosion was a consequence of land subsidence caused by volcanic mud eruptions, known as the Sidoarjo mud flow, that began erupting in late May and early June at the site of the Banjar-Panji 1 exploration well drilled by PT Lapindo Brantas.

== Kenya ==
- 2011 Nairobi pipeline fire kills approximately 100 people and hospitalized 120.

== Lithuania ==
- 2023 Lithuania–Latvia pipeline explosion: a large explosion occurs on the Lithuania–Latvia Interconnection natural gas pipeline in Pasvalys District Municipality, Lithuania. Explosion temporarily cut off gas supply from Lithuania to Latvia and forced villages surrounding in Pasvalys District to evacuate.

== Malaysia ==
- 2014: Petronas Gas pipeline explosion in the state of Sarawak, Malaysia, ripped apart a portion of the RM3bil Sabah to Sarawak interstate gas pipeline between Lawas and Long Sukang in the northernmost district of Sarawak at 2 a.m., resulting in the evacuation of nearby villagers.
- 2025: Putra Heights pipeline fire— On April 1, a section of a gas pipeline owned by Petronas ruptured in Putra Heights, Selangor, causing a massive fire that injured 305 people.

== Mexico ==
- 1959: On July 1, a petroleum pipeline exploded, and burned for 7 hours in Coatzacoalcos. 12 people were killed, and 100 more injured.
- 1978: On November 1, a gas pipeline exploded and burned, killing 52 people in colonia Benito Juarez, Mexico, and injuring 11 in a town of only 100 people. The failure created a crater 300 feet (91 m) wide and 20 feet (6.1 m) deep.
- 2010: The explosion on December 19, 2010 of an oil pipeline at a Petroleos Mexicanos (Pemex) pumping station in San Martín Texmelucan de Labastida in central Mexico, killed at least 27 people and injured more than 50. The explosion is believed to have been caused by attempts to puncture the pipe to steal oil.
- 2012: On September 18, twenty-two workers died when a gas leak from a Kinder Morgan pipeline at Reynosa, Tamaulipas, Mexico sparked an explosion which became a fireball that overtook workers running for their lives. Lead plaintiff Javier Alvarez del Castillo said, "They were engulfed in fire that burnt and singed every inch of skin from their head to their ankles, taking every bit of hair from their head, laying the plaintiffs 'skinless,' like skeletons bare to the bones, with in most cases only their footwear attached to the only portion of their body not reduced to skeleton." He blamed Kinder Morgan for not adding enough of the odorant methyl mercaptan to the gas. (Natural gas is odorless, so energy companies add the sulfur compound to make leaks smelly and therefore noticeable.) "A gas company may be liable if facts show that it fails to act reasonably after having notice of defects in the pipes through which gas flows," the ruling states, citing the Texas appellate court case Entex, a Division of NorAm Energy Corp. v. Gonzalez. On July 13, 2016, a U.S. Federal Court ruled that only Kinder Morgan and not any of the other companies originally sued by plaintiffs’ groups should face the charges of gross negligence and negligence. The cause of the leak was a valve that apparently failed as workers performed routine testing, but gaps remain in what is known about the events that led up to the Reynosa explosion.
- 2019: On 18 January 2019, a pipeline transporting gasoline exploded in the town of Tlahuelilpan, in the Mexican state of Hidalgo killed at least 96 people and injured dozens more. The explosion is believed to be related to the government crackdown on fuel thieves.
- 2021: On July 2, a Pemex oil pipeline ruptured and leaked in the Gulf of Mexico, the rupture caused flames to go up causing the water to be on fire and in flames.

== Nigeria ==
- 1998: At Jesse in the Niger Delta in Nigeria, a petroleum pipeline exploded killing well over 500 villagers, some of whom were scavenging gasoline. The worst of several similar incidents in this country. (October 18, 1998)
- 2000: Another pipeline explosion near the town of Jesse killed about 250 villagers. (July 10, 2000)
- 2000: At least 100 villagers died when a ruptured pipeline exploded in Warri. (July 16, 2000)
- 2000: A leaking pipeline caught fire near the fishing village of Ebute near Lagos, killing at least 60 people. (November 30, 2000)
- 2003: A pipeline punctured by thieves exploded and killed 125 villagers near Umuahia, Abia State. (June 19, 2003)
- 2004: A pipeline punctured by thieves exploded and killed dozens of people in Lagos State. (September 17, 2004)
- 2006: An oil pipeline punctured by thieves exploded and killed 150 people at the Atlas Creek Island in Lagos State. (May 12, 2006)
- 2006: A vandalised oil pipeline exploded in Lagos. Up to 500 people may have been killed. (December 26, 2006)
- 2008: The 2008 Ijegun pipeline explosion (May 16)
- 2016: Vandalism at the Akulagba pipeline in Warri South – West Local Government Area of Delta State (January 22, 2016)
- 2016: The Fire explosion at Arepo and other coastal communities Pipeline in Ogun State (July 29, 2016)
- 2018: Explosion hits major gas pipeline in Nigeria
- 2018: https://www.youtube.com/watch?v=XlDjvvNUTsc
- 2018: http://www.energyglobalnews.com/nigeria-aba-pipe-line-blast-killed-200/
- 2019: https://www.africanews.com/2019/06/23/at-least-8-killed-in-pipeline-explosion-in-south-eastern-nigeria//
- 2019: More than 50 missing after oil pipeline explosion in Nigeria
- 2019: https://www.aa.com.tr/en/africa/-nigeria-pipeline-explosion-death-toll-climbs-to-7/1665651
- 2020: At Least Five Dead In Nigerian Oil Pipeline Explosion | OilPrice.com

== Russia ==
- 1989: The Ufa train disaster: Sparks from two passing trains caused gas leaking from an LPG pipeline near Ufa, Russia, to explode. Workers with the pipeline noticed pressure dropping in the line, but they increased pressure instead of searching for a leak. Trees up to 4 km (2.5 mi) away were felled by the blast, and 2 locomotives and 38 passenger cars on the trains were derailed. Up to 645 people were reported killed on June 4, 1989.

== Taiwan ==
- 2014: On the night of July 31, a string of explosions originating in buried gas pipes occurred in the city of Kaohsiung. Leaking gas, suspected to be propylene, filled the storm drains along several major thoroughfares and the resulting explosions turned several kilometers of road surface into deep trenches, sending vehicles, people and debris high into the air and igniting fires over a large area. At least 30 people were killed and over 300 injured.

== United States ==
From 1994 through 2013, the U.S. had 745 serious incidents with gas distribution, causing 278 fatalities and 1,059 injuries, with $110,658,083 in property damage.

From 1994 through 2013, there were an additional 110 serious incidents with gas transmission, resulting in 41 fatalities, 195 injuries, and $448,900,333 in property damage.

From 1994 through 2013, there were an additional 941 serious incidents with gas all system type, resulting in 363 fatalities, 1,392 injuries, and $823,970,000 in property damage.

A recent Wall Street Journal review found that there were 1,400 pipeline spills and accidents in the U.S. 2010–2013. According to the Journal review, four in every five pipeline accidents are discovered by local residents, not the companies that own the pipelines.

- 1965 (March 4): A 32-inch (81 cm) gas transmission pipeline, north of Natchitoches, Louisiana, belonging to the Tennessee Gas Pipeline exploded and burned from Stress corrosion cracking (SCC) on March 4, killing 17 people. At least 9 others were injured, and 7 homes 450 feet (140 m) from the rupture were destroyed. The same pipeline had also had an explosion on May 9, 1955, just 930 feet (280 m) from the 1965 failure.
- 1991 (March 3): The largest inland oil spill in U.S. history occurred near Grand Rapids, Minnesota when Enbridge's Line 3 pipeline ruptured, spilling 1.7 million US gallons (6,400,000 L) of crude oil onto a wetland and into the Prairie River, a tributary of the Mississippi River.
- 1999 (June 10): An Olympic gasoline pipeline ruptured near Bellingham, Washington, resulting in 3 deaths: a fly fisherman and two 10-year-old boys. The cause was a series of errors and malfunctions in relief systems and process control computer systems in the Olympic Pipe Line Company's system, resulting in 277,000 US gallons (1,050,000 L) of gasoline spilled to Whatcom Creek. The fire burned for five days.
- 2000 (19 August): A 30-inch (76 cm) El Paso Energy natural gas pipeline exploded, killing twelve people in southeast New Mexico. They were camping under a bridge which carried the pipeline across the Pecos River. The explosion occurred underground on the east side of the river 200 to 300 yards (180 to 270 m) from the campers around 5:30 a.m. The explosion left a crater 86 feet (26 m) long, 46 feet (14 m) wide and 20 feet (6.1 m) deep. The fireball was visible 20 miles (32 km) north in Carlsbad, New Mexico. The pipeline was installed in 1950.
- 2004 (May 24): A pinhole-sized leak caused by wear unleashed thousands of gallons of gasoline that fueled the BP / Olympic pipeline fire and explosion near the Westfield Shoppingtown Southcenter in Renton, Washington. The blaze sent three firefighters to the hospital, and a mile-square area, which included a nearby fire station, was cordoned off. The leak occurred in a half-inch-wide tube of stainless steel that Olympic operators use to extract fuel samples from the system's 16-inch (410 mm)-wide main line. A metal electrical conduit had rubbed against the stainless steel sampling tube to open the pinhole leak.
- 2010 (September 9): The San Bruno pipeline explosion: At 6:11 PM, a PG&E 30-inch (760 mm) natural gas line exploded in San Bruno, California, killing 8. Eyewitnesses reported the initial blast "had a wall of fire more than 1,000 feet high".
- 2010 (July 25): The Kalamazoo River oil spill: Crude oil pipeline ruptures near Marshall, Michigan, spilling over 840,000 US gallons (3,200,000 L) of oil into the Kalamazoo River.
- 2012 (23 November): A natural gas explosion injured 18 people and damaged 42 buildings in the entertainment district of Springfield, Massachusetts. The explosion was blamed Sunday on a utility worker who accidentally punctured a high-pressure pipeline while looking for a leak.
- 2012 (12 December): A 20-inch (51 cm) transmission line owned by NiSource Inc., parent of Columbia Gas, exploded, leveling 4 houses, between Sissonville and Pocatalico in Kanawha County, West Virginia. When it blew, nobody at pipeline operator, Columbia Gas Transmission knew it. An 800-foot (240 m) section of I-77 was obliterated. "The fire melted the interstate and it looked like lava, just boiling." Later the West Virginia Public Service Commission released several pages of violations by Columbia Gas. Forty families were "impacted" by the explosion. The investigation cited "external corrosion" as the cause of the blast.
- 2013 (29 March): ExxonMobil pipeline carrying Canadian Wabasca heavy crude from the Athabasca oil sands ruptured in Mayflower, Arkansas, about 25 miles northwest of Little Rock. Approximately 12,000 barrels (1,900 m3) of oil mixed with water had been recovered by March 31. Twenty-two homes were evacuated.[1] The United States Environmental Protection Agency (EPA) classified the leak as a major spill. A reported 5,000−7,000 barrels of crude were released.
- 2013 (20 August): Explosion of a natural gas pipeline near Kiowa southwest of Oklahoma City.
- 2013 (8 October): Explosion of a natural gas pipeline near Rosston, Oklahoma.
- 2014 (January 25): A Trans Canada pipeline about 15 miles south of Winnipeg ruptured and exploded. The incident prompted the precautionary closure of two nearby pipelines. The pipelines supply the main source of natural gas to more than 100,000 Xcel Energy customers in eastern North Dakota, northwestern Minnesota and western Wisconsin. The explosion happened near Otterburne, Manitoba, about 15 miles south of the provincial capital, Winnipeg. The area was evacuated as a precaution. No injuries were reported but the fire burned for more than 12 hours.
- 2014 (February): In Knifely, Adair County, Kentucky, a Columbia Gulf gas pipeline exploded at 1 a.m. flattening homes, burning barns, and causing one casualty. The 30-inch (760 mm) natural gas pipeline was about 100 feet from Highway 76 and buried 30 feet underground. When it exploded, large rocks and sections of pipeline flew into the air, leaving a 60-foot crater. Columbia Gulf, part of NiSource's Columbia Pipeline Group, owns and operates more than 15,700 miles of natural gas pipelines, one of the largest underground storage systems in North America. The pipeline that exploded was carrying natural gas from the Gulf of Mexico to New York.
- 2014 (February 11): A Hiland gas pipeline exploded about six miles south of Tioga, North Dakota. Hiland was "blowing" hydrates, ice-like solids formed from a mixture of water and gas that can block pipeline flow, out of the pipeline.
- 2014 (March 14): A Northern Natural Gas Company pipeline erupted near the intersection of county roads 20 and O, about six miles north of Fremont, Nebraska. A company spokesman said, "In the summer you can tell if you've got a gas leak by vegetation, sometimes it dies in the ground."
- 2014 (May 26): A Viking gas pipeline explosion near Warren, Minnesota shot a fireball over 100 feet in the air. Roads within a two-mile radius were blocked off. Authorities suspected natural causes because there was still frost in the ground and the soil was wet.
- 2017 (November 16): TransCanada's Keystone Pipeline leaked 5,000 barrels of crude oil in Marshall County in northeastern South Dakota. Officials don't believe the leak affected any surface water bodies or threatened any drinking water systems.
- 2018 (June 7): A landslide caused a newly installed natural gas pipeline to rupture and explode in Marshall County, WV along TransCanada's Midstream Pipeline at 4:20 a.m., releasing $437,250 worth of natural gas. Flames from the ruptured pipeline were visible for miles, but no one was injured in the explosion.
- 2018 (September 13): Suspected over-pressurization of natural gas pipes by Columbia Gas caused multiple explosions and fires in 3 towns in Massachusetts (Andover, Lawrence, and North Andover), leaving one dead.
- 2019 (October): the Keystone pipeline ruptured causing over 383,000 gallons of oil to contaminate surrounding wetlands in North Dakota. By mid-November, state regulators raised the reported acreage of contaminated land to about 209,100 square feet of wetlands.
- 2019 (August 1): An Enbridge natural gas pipeline ruptured causing a massive explosion in Lincoln County, Kentucky, leaving 1 person dead and 5 hospitalized. The explosion and resulting fire destroyed railroad tracks and at least 5 homes in a nearby trailer park.

== See also ==
- List of oil spills
- List of pipeline accidents in the United States
- Natural gas pipeline system in United States
  - Pigging
- Hydrostatic test
- Varanus Island, Western Australia
  - 2008 Western Australian gas crisis
- Palaceknowe Gas Pipeline Failure, Moffat, Beattock
