= 2003 Etobicoke gas explosion =

Industrial disaster in Toronto, Canada

Coordinates: 43.6401°N 79.5421°W

- Date: Thursday, April 24, 2003
- Time: 1:30pm
- Location: Toronto, Ontario, Canada
- Deaths: 7
- Injuries: 4

The 2003 Etobicoke gas explosion was a disaster which occurred on April 24, 2003, after a backhoe operated by Enbridge contractor Precision Utility breached a pipeline on Bloor Street in the Etobicoke district of Toronto, Ontario. The resulting explosion destroyed a two-story mixed commercial and residential building, killing seven people and injuring another four. Enbridge and several other companies were fined for the disaster in 2011. A memorial garden was dedicated at the site of the explosion in 2008.

== Cause ==
On April 24, 2003, road work was being conducted to fix flooding concerns. Enbridge contracted Precision Utility to locate natural gas pipelines along Bloor Street, west of Kipling Avenue. A pipeline leading into a plaza was not identified and an employee struck the pipeline with a backhoe, causing natural gas to leak into the basement of a two-story strip mall with businesses and residential housing. The workers immediately noticed the error and went to their vehicles to obtain tools to fix the leak.

== Explosion ==
At around 1:30 pm, the gas leaking out from the pipeline ignited, destroying the strip mall and damaging nearby buildings. The explosion also caused a fire which damaged an adjacent house. One hundred people and 25 fire trucks worked to extinguish the fire. Windows in stores across the street were blown out, windshields were damaged on cars and one vehicle was destroyed.

Seven people were killed in the explosion. Robert Fairley was a resident of the building while Adele Brown, Elizabeth Roy and Lillian Guglietti were clients at a salon in the strip mall. Dora Carambelas, Tina Kirkimtzis, and Irene Miyama were also in the building when it exploded. Four people were also injured by falling debris.

After Hurricane Hazel, this explosion was the second-highest loss of life for a single event in Etobicoke. This is also the highest loss of life for an incident involving a pipeline in Canadian history.

== Outcome ==
In April 2004, charges were laid concerning this incident but were dismissed in 2007. The dismissal was appealed and the case was reconsidered in 2011. Warren Bitulithic Limited pled guilty to one charge under the Technical Standards and Safety Act in 2006. The charge was for damaging a natural gas pipeline without permission. The company was fined $225 000.

Enbridge pled guilty to one charge under the Ontario Occupational Health and Safety Act and fined $350 000. They also pled guilty to another charge under the Technical Standards and Safety Act, requiring Enbridge to pay another $350 000 fine. The charges were for not evacuating gas services and not locating and marking the gas services before excavation. Four additional charges placed against Enbridge were withdrawn. Precision Utility pled guilty and was fined $200 000 for not properly supervising an employee while they were locating the natural gas lines. An investigation by the Ministry of Labour found that the Precision employee did not locate the pipelines by using available information and did not act when they should have noticed the presence of natural gas. Each fine included a victim surcharge where an additional 25% of their fines would be paid to help the victims of this incident.

By 2011 townhouses had been built on the site of the explosion. Milano’s Pizza, one of the businesses in the strip-mall, reopened across the street. Peter Roy, the son of Elizabeth Roy, campaigned for gas companies to regularly install excess flow valves on pipelines to protect against runaway gas and high flow rates. He reported that Enbridge has begun doing this on their projects. Volunteers also established a scholarship for a student attending Humber College who is going to have a job in the gas sector.

Five years after the explosion, a memorial plaque, garden and two benches were placed at the site of the explosion during a memorial service. The service was organised by then-Toronto City Councillor Peter Milczyn.

== See also ==
- List of pipeline accidents
- Toronto propane explosion
