= Ijegun =

Village in Lagos State, Nigeria

Coordinates: 6.517°N 3.257°E

- Metropolitan city
- Location of Ijegun in Lagos State, Nigeria
- State: Lagos State
- Local Government Area: Alimosho

Government
  - Governor: Babajide Sanwo-Olu APC
- Time zone: UTC+1 (CET)
  - Summer (DST): UTC+1 (CEST)
- Postal Code: 100266

The village of Ijegun is a northern suburban community in Alimosho Local Government Area of Lagos State, Nigeria.The area is home to oil tank farms.

== History ==
On May 15, 2008, Ijegun was devastated by a massive explosion, killing over 100 people, after a bulldozer struck and ignited an oil pipeline. Another pipeline explosion occurred in 2019.

== Education Close-by ==
- Ijegun Comprehensive High School
