= Tlahuelilpan =

- Town and municipality
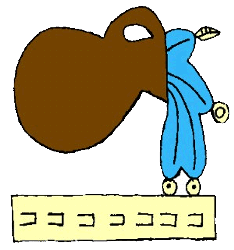
- Coat of arms

- Location within Hidalgo Location within Mexico
- Coordinates: 20°07′47″N 99°13′43″W
- Country: Mexico
- State: Hidalgo
- Municipality: Tlahuelilpan

Government
  - Federal electoral district: Hidalgo's 6th

Area
  - Total: 31.3 km^{2} (12.1 sq mi)

Population (2010 census)
  - Total: 17,153
  - Density: 548/km^{2} (1,420/sq mi)
- Time zone: UTC-6 (Zona Centro)

Tlahuelilpan (Spanish pronunciation: [tlaweˈlilpan]; Nahuatl languages: Tlaualilpan, lit. 'place where the lands are irrigated') is a town and one of the 84 municipalities of Hidalgo, in central Mexico. The municipality covers an area of 31.3 km^{2} (12.1 sq mi). As of the 2010 census, the municipality had a total population of 17,153.

== History ==
On January 18, 2019, the town was the site of a deadly pipeline explosion, killing 130 people and causing 48 injuries. On March 24, 2019, a new leak from a clandestine gasoline operation was detected two months after the explosion that left 135 dead.
