= 2006 Atlas Creek pipeline explosion =

Industrial disaster in Nigeria

The 2006 Atlas Creek pipeline explosion was a disaster that occurred on 12 May 2006 at Atlas Creek Island (sometimes called Isanki Island), near Lagos, Nigeria, when a pressurized petrol pipeline that had been ruptured by thieves exploded, killing 150 people. The Nigerian Red Cross said that vandals had originally drilled holes into the pipe to steal fuel, and that local people had then come down with jerrycans to fill them with fuel. Approximately 500 jerrycans were found at the scene of the explosion, which incinerated anyone within a 20-metre radius. Many victims were buried nearby in a mass grave.

President Olusegun Obasanjo ordered a full police investigation to determine the circumstances and to protect the pipeline from similar events. However, local officials were accused of turning a blind-eye to the issue as explosion continued to rock the country.

== See also ==
- 2006 Abule Egba pipeline explosion
- 2010 South Kivu tank truck explosion
- 2019 Tlahuelilpan pipeline explosion
- List of pipeline accidents
- Gasoline theft

== Sources ==
- Scores die in Nigeria fuel blast Scores die in Nigeria fuel blast. Retrieved: 25 September 2011.
- Probe ordered after Nigeria blast Retrieved: 25 September 2011.
