= Salamanca nightclub shooting =

2019 mass shooting in Mexico

- Location: 20.5777°N 101.2123°W; Salamanca, Guanajuato, Mexico
- Date: 9 March 2019
- Attack type: Mass shooting
- Deaths: 15
- Injuries: 5–7
- Perpetrators: Santa Rosa de Lima Cartel (suspected); Jalisco New Generation Cartel (suspected)

On 9 March 2019, a mass shooting occurred in La Playa Men's Club, a nightclub in Salamanca, Guanajuato, Mexico. Fifteen people were killed, and five to seven people were injured. Fourteen victims were later identified as Jalisco New Generation Cartel members. Witnesses described the attackers as a group of armed men who arrived in three vans.

The Mexican government later alleged that the attackers were part of the Santa Rosa de Lima Cartel and announced that they had identified several individual attackers. Five days before the shooting took place, an operation was launched by the Mexican government to crack down on this cartel. Two days after the shooting took place, the Santa Rosa de Lima cartel posted on Twitter that an CJNG member known as Julio, aka "El Trompas," was the main perpetrator of the shootings.

== Aftermath ==
On 24 March 2019, local Santa Rosa de Lima cartel leader Agustin Medina Soto was arrested. On 16 July 2019, it was revealed that all of the remaining resources of the Santa Rosa de Lima cartel, as well as the property of its leader José Antonio Yépez Ortiz (alias “El Marro”), were seized by Mexican authorities. Blocked accounts held by Yépez and people linked to him contain a total of nearly 35.5 million pesos (US$1.85 million).
