= Jesse, Nigeria =

Town in Nigeria

Coordinates: 5°52′14″N 5°45′11″E

Jesse Town (also known as Idjhere) is a clan and settlement in the Ethiope area of Nigeria's Delta State. It has its own native government authority led by an Ovie as is typical of other Urhobo towns. The town is host to onshore petroleum deposits.

== Incidents ==
The 1998 Jesse pipeline explosion was reported to have been one of the largest pipeline explosions in Nigeria.
