= 1998 Jesse pipeline explosion =

1998 pipeline explosion in Nigeria

Location of Jesse, Nigeria

On 18 October 1998, a pipeline explosion occurred in the community of Jesse (geographical coordinates 5.870°N 5.750°E), Delta State, Nigeria. The cause of the blast has been debated. The Nigerian government stated the explosion took place after scavengers intentionally ruptured the pipeline with their tools and ignited the blaze; however, others have stated the pipeline ruptured due to a lack of maintenance and neglect with a cigarette igniting the fire. With 1,082 deaths attributed to the blast, the 1998 Jesse explosion has the distinction of being the deadliest pipeline explosion to have occurred in Nigeria.

Located in the Niger Delta, the ruptured pipeline was owned by the Nigerian National Petroleum Corporation (NNPC), and served as a link between an oil refinery in the southeastern town of Warri, 340 kilometres (210 mi) southeast of Lagos, and Kaduna, 610 kilometres (380 mi) north of Warri. After igniting on 18 October, the fire burned until a firefighting company from the United States was able to extinguish the blaze on 23 October with a nitrogen-rich foam. During a visit on 19 October, Nigerian President Abdulsalami Abubakar promised to provide the necessary support to give aid in addition to develop solutions to prevent these types of tragedies from occurring again.

Weeks after the explosion, the death toll continued to rise as many of those with injuries died while in hospitals, while others fled care as a result of fearing arrest by the Nigerian government on suspicion of igniting the blaze. Due to the intensity of the blaze, many victims were too badly burned to be identified, and as a result over 300 bodies were buried in mass graves.

== See also ==
- List of pipeline accidents
