= Nagaram, Mamidikuduru mandal =

Nagaram
- Village
- Nagaram
- Interactive map of Nagaram
- Location in Andhra Pradesh
- Coordinates: 16.501106°N 81.910726°E
- Country: India
- State: Andhra Pradesh
- District: Konaseema
- Elevation: 30 m (98 ft)

Population (2011)
  - Total: 6,524

Languages
  - Official: Telugu
- Time zone: UTC+5:30 (IST)
- PIN: 533247

Nagaram is a coastal village in the Konaseema district of Andhra Pradesh in South India. It is 13 km away from district headquarters Amalapuram, 78 km from Kakinada and 230 km from Visakhapatnam. It falls on National Highway 216 which connects Ongole to Kathipudi in Andhra Pradesh.

== Geography and climate ==
Nagaram is located at 16.501106°N 81.910726°E at an average altitude of 100 metres (330 ft).

== Muharram ==
Every year, Many Shia Muslims gather here from neighbouring towns and villages namely Amalapuram, Mummidivaram, Draksharamam and Rajamahendravaram to take part in Muharram processions. The processions start in Nagaram immediately after viewing the Moon which marks the beginning of Muharram Month. People mostly gather in Nagaram from 7th Muharram. People who follow Hindu religion also worship. Muharram holds a lot of prominence in Nagaram.
