= Huachicolero =

Person engaged in motor fuel theft

In Mexico, a huachicolero or guachicolero is a person dedicated to the theft and illicit sale of motor fuel (primarily petrol and diesel) and adulterated alcoholic beverages. Fuel theft has been on the increase in the country in recent years.

== Etymology ==
The word derives from huachicol – originally, according to the Mexican Academy of the Language, an alcoholic beverage adulterated with low-grade alcohol made from sugarcane – plus the suffix -ero, indicating a profession, occupation or device. El Colegio de México's Diccionario del español de México offers two definitions for huachicol or guachicol: a tool comprising a pole with a basket on one end, used to pick fruit from trees, or the person who uses such a tool; and "a criminal who steals fuel by tapping the pipelines that carry it."

According to the academy's Diccionario de Mexicanismos, the term also derives from the word guacho, from the Mayan word waach, which means "thief" in some parts of Mexico.

== Modern-day illegal activities ==
Fuel theft from pipelines owned by Pemex, the state oil company, has been a long-term problem in Mexico. The problem worsened in the 2010s, as organized crime groups in Mexico began including oil theft as part of their main streams of revenue. With the international soaring of fuel prices, this criminal activity became a lucrative business for thieves. Oil theft crime groups used bribery and violence to corrupt government officials. Investigators suspect that several officials within Pemex are involved in facilitating the operations of these criminal groups. Complicity includes activities such as employees sharing the exact time when the fuel will flow through the pipelines, the maps of the pipelines, and how to successfully perforate them.

Illegally extracting or possessing oil from pipelines, vehicles, equipment, or installations is a federal crime in Mexico and is punishable with up to 20 years in prison. The fuel they steal is generally sold on the black market at a discounted price. These groups have gained support from impoverished communities because they provide low-cost fuel and give some locals a venue for employment as fuel carriers and lookouts. Their supply of illegal fuel is believed to sustain entire communities in some parts of the states of Veracruz, Puebla and Hidalgo.

By mid-2018, the rate of pipeline perforations had risen considerably to slightly over 40 perforations per day, compared to 28 perforations per day in 2017. In the first 10 months of 2018, 12,581 illegal perforations were reported across pipelines in Mexico. As a result of the increase of fuel theft, the federal government has spent approximately US$3 billion per year on pipeline repairs and maintenance, as well as compensation to oil consumers for whom the oil was intended.

Given the volatile nature of motor fuel, accidents are common: in December 2010, an explosion in San Martín Texmelucan de Labastida, Puebla, killed 29 people, and at least 137 were killed in the Tlahuelilpan pipeline explosion in Hidalgo on 18 January 2019.

When President Andrés Manuel López Obrador took office in December 2018, he launched a campaign against oil theft gangs, and dispatched close to 5,000 troops from the Armed Forces and the Federal Police to guard pipelines across Mexico. Part of his strategy was to divert the flow of fuel from pipelines, detect leaks when they occurred, and transport the fuel by trucks. Most of the thieves operate in remote areas, and drill at the pipelines during the night to avoid detection. These measures were intended to stop the thieves from illegally tapping fuel pipes. When implemented, however, the measures led to logistical problems, resulting in fuel shortages and long lines at filling stations nationwide, in January 2019. The Federal Police component would be later be replaced by the National Guard in the late spring when that service was officially created by an act of Congress.

== See also ==
- Pemex
- Petroleum industry in Mexico
