= 2006 Abule Egba pipeline explosion =

The 2006 Abule Egba pipeline explosion is a disaster that occurred in the heavily populated neighborhood of Abule Egba in Lagos, Nigeria, on 26 December 2006, killing hundreds of people. There were originally believed to be around 500 deaths, but it was later confirmed that the loss was smaller.

The incident occurred after an elevated pipeline carrying petroleum products was punctured by thieves earlier at midnight (local time), attracting hundreds of scavengers in the district who collected the fuel using plastic containers, allegedly to siphon fuel into a tanker, before puddles of fallen fuel were ignited after dawn. The cause of the explosion remains unknown, while witnesses have stated that the broken pipeline was tapped when the blast occurred.

The number of people killed is unclear, but is evidenced to be in the hundreds. Abiodun Orebiyi, the secretary-general of the Nigerian Red Cross (NRC), estimated that there were at least 200 dead but indicated that there was no official death toll and was unable to determine the final number of deaths, stating that the NRC "[doesn't] know if it is 300, 400 or 500". He also added that 60 people had been taken to the hospital with serious burns, while a number of houses had been destroyed, along with a mosque and a church. Another senior official, Ige Oladimeji, was quoted as saying that there has been 260 documented to be dead by nightfall. On the day of the explosion, a Reuters news agency photographer estimated 500 bodies in the scene.

== See also ==
- 2006 Atlas Creek pipeline explosion
- 2010 South Kivu tank truck explosion
- List of pipeline accidents
- Gasoline theft
