= Villagrán, Guanajuato =

Coordinates: 20.517°N 100.983°W

Villagrán is a Mexican city (and municipality) located in the state of Guanajuato. With an area of 125.4 square kilometres, Villagrán accounts for 0.41% of the surface of the state. It is bordered to the north by Santa Cruz de Juventino Rosas, to the east by Celaya, to the south by Cortazar, and to the west by Salamanca. The municipality had a population of 65,791 according to the 2020 census. Located in the fertile Bajío, the economy of the Villagran is heavily based on agriculture and ranching.

The municipal president of the city and its microregions is Armando Torrecilas Mejía.
