= Tlahuelilpan pipeline explosion =

2019 gasoline pipeline explosion in the state of Hidalgo, Mexico

- Date: 18 January 2019
- Time: 17:04 CST (leak reported) / 19:10 CST (explosion)
- Location: Tlahuelilpan, Hidalgo, Mexico; 20°07′03″N 99°13′10″W
- Cause: Fuel-air explosion, caused by illegal tapping into the pipeline
- Deaths: 137
- Suspects: Huachicoleros

On 18 January 2019, a pipeline transporting gasoline exploded in the town of Tlahuelilpan, in the Mexican state of Hidalgo. The blast killed at least 137 people and injured dozens more. Mexican authorities blamed fuel thieves, who had illegally tapped the pipeline. The explosion was particularly deadly because large crowds of people had gathered at the scene to steal fuel. Security forces tried to persuade people to move away from the scene, but they were outnumbered and asked not to engage with civilians for fear of causing a violent confrontation. The leak was reported at 17:04 CST (23:04 UTC), and the explosion occurred two hours later at 19:10. It took about four hours for responders to extinguish the fire.

== Background ==
Fuel theft from pipelines owned by Pemex, the state oil company, has been a long-term problem in Mexico. The problem worsened in the 2010s as organized crime groups in Mexico began including gasoline theft as part of their main streams of revenue. With the international soaring of fuel prices, this criminal activity became a lucrative business for thieves. Gasoline theft crime groups used bribery and violence to corrupt government officials. Investigators suspect that several officials within Pemex are involved in facilitating the operations of these criminal groups. Complicity includes activities such as employees sharing the exact time when the fuel will flow through the pipelines, the maps of the pipelines, and how to successfully perforate them.

Illegally extracting, possessing, or safeguarding petrochemicals from pipelines, vehicles, equipment, or installations is a federal crime in Mexico and is punishable with up to 20 years in prison. The gasoline thieves are known in Mexico as huachicoleros, a name derived from the slang term huachicol, or poor-quality alcohol. The gasoline they steal is often sold in public at a discounted price. These groups have gained support from impoverished communities because they provide low-cost gasoline and give some locals a venue for employment as fuel carriers and lookouts. Their supply of illegal fuel is believed to sustain entire communities in some parts of the states of Veracruz, Puebla and Hidalgo, where the explosion occurred.

By mid-2018, the rate of pipeline perforations had risen considerably to slightly over 40 perforations per day, compared to 28 perforations a day in 2017. In the first 10 months of 2018, 12,581 illegal perforations were reported across pipelines in Mexico. The states in Mexico with the highest illegal perforations reported between 2016 and 2018 were Hidalgo, Puebla, Guanajuato, Jalisco, Veracruz, State of Mexico, and Tamaulipas. In 2018, Hidalgo was the state with the most illegal perforations reported with 2,121. In Tlahuelilpan alone, at least 70 illegal perforations were reported from 2016 to the day of the explosion. However, Tula headed the count in the state of Hidalgo with 500 perforations reported in 2018 alone. As a result of the increase in fuel theft, the federal government has spent approximately US$3 billion a year on pipeline repairs and maintenance, as well as compensation to buyers for whom the product was intended.

When President Andrés Manuel López Obrador took office in December 2018, he launched a campaign against gasoline theft gangs, and dispatched close to 5,000 troops from the Mexican Armed Forces and the Federal Police to guard pipelines across Mexico. Part of his strategy was to divert the flow of fuel from pipelines, detect leaks when they occurred, and transport the fuel by trucks. Most of the thieves operate in remote areas, and drill at the pipelines during the night to avoid detection. These measures were intended to stop the thieves from illegally tapping fuel pipes. When implemented, however, the measures led to logistical problems, resulting in fuel shortages and long lines at gas stations nationwide in January 2019.

== Explosion ==
Tlahuelilpan is crossed by one of the country's main fuel pipelines, connecting the port of Tuxpan, Veracruz, with the Pemex complex at Tula, Hidalgo, some 13 kilometres (8 mi) to the southwest of the town. Reports of residents collecting what appeared to be fuel in the San Primitivo district of the town started circulating on social media during the afternoon of 18 January 2019. A video shot earlier and later uploaded to YouTube showed local residents with buckets, jerrycans and water bottles swarming around a large petrol fountain coming from a rupture in the pipeline; witnesses interviewed later on local television spoke of a crowd numbering in the hundreds, "or perhaps even a thousand". Other accounts stated that some residents, including children, were jokingly throwing gasoline at each other and horseplaying near the breach zone. A 911 call to local police reported the leak at 17:04 hours, and the explosion occurred at 19:10 hours. When first informed of the leak, Pemex did not initially close the valve because they did not consider the leak "important". It took four hours to extinguish the explosion's fire. Residents from the surrounding areas were evacuated.

It is believed that the fountain caused fumes of the fuel to fill the air which later ignited in a huge fireball that consumed the surrounding fields which had been soaked with fuel. The exact cause of the fire that ignited the spill is not yet known. Investigators' first hypothesis was that the gases produced by the leak and the electricity sparks caused by the friction of people's synthetic clothes may have caused the explosion. The explosion was particularly deadly because the free gasoline attracted large numbers of people to the breach zone. Residents also stated that the shortage of gasoline in the area may have prompted many to attend the scene when they heard of the breach.

There were about 25 troops at the site, but Secretary of Defense Luis Cresencio Sandoval stated that there were not enough personnel to turn back the 600–800 residents who had reached the site in search of fuel. He stated that the Army tried to persuade villagers to not get near the breach zone, and that some became aggressive when asked to turn back. None of the residents were carrying firearms, but some were armed with sticks and stones. The soldiers did not intervene with civilians as they were outnumbered. They were also asked by their leadership not to engage with potential fuel thieves at the scene when residents started flocking to the breach, because they feared a shootout would break out and unarmed civilians would be hurt or that soldiers would be killed by an angry mob.

== Reactions ==
The military's DN-III Plan for civilian assistance and disaster relief was activated on the evening of 18 January. Several of the wounded victims were transported via helicopter to hospitals in Hidalgo, State of Mexico, and Mexico City. Some of the minors were expected to be sent to Shriners Hospitals for Children in the U.S. state of Texas. Hidalgo Governor Omar Fayad said that the government would take care of the medical and funeral expenses. He stated that the government would not pursue legal action against the civilians who were taking the stolen gasoline from the pipeline that exploded. Fayad confirmed that the government had information booths at the cultural center in Tlahuelilpan with the lists of the victims and the hospitals where they were to receive treatment. The list was also available on the government's website.

Investigators helped recover the corpses and ordered the bodies to be sent to morgues in Tula and Mixquiahuala for their official identification. They stated that the bodies would take several months to be fully identified. Given the fact that many bodies experienced high degree burns, face-to-face recognition was deemed nearly impossible. Families were asked to identify the bodies by the belongings found at the scene. Mexican authorities asked the victim's family members to complete a DNA test to assist in the identification process. Investigators stated they would likely take the remains to institutions in the U.S. or Europe to facilitate the process. The victims' family members, however, confronted the investigators at the breach scene and asked them to not take the bodies. They criticized the investigators for wanting to take the bodies to morgues under the assumption that they were doing it for monetary gains. The families stated that traveling outside of Tlahuelilpan to recover the bodies would be difficult for them due to the shortage in gasoline and because it would prove expensive for them.

President López Obrador canceled meetings he had in Jalisco and Guanajuato upon hearing about the explosion. He visited Tlahuelilpan on the morning of 19 January, to oversee relief operations. He also promised to step up efforts to counter cartels running fuel theft. Part of his promise included a commitment to continue to crack down on petrochemical theft groups, as well as finding alternatives for citizens so that they do not depend on illegal fuel. He asked the residents of Tlahuelilpan to give their testimonies of the events, and also to provide information to law enforcement on the black market in the region, including the names of those involved in the gasoline theft gangs and details of their operations.

Pemex chief executive Octavio Romero Oropeza stated that pipelines in the central Mexico area had been subject to at least 10 breaches in the past three months. One of those perforations caused a fire, which took 12 hours to extinguish on 12 December 2018. Following these incidents, the pipeline was put under repair on 23 December and remained suspended until 15 January, the official confirmed. During its suspension, Romero Oropeza said that the pipeline was breached four times. It resumed operations on 17 January, a day before the explosion.

The mayor of Tlahuelilpan, Juan Pedro Cruz Frías, asked residents to take precautionary measures after a toxic smog was present in the town's air after the explosion. When asked about his thoughts on the incident, the mayor stated that the victims acted out of "necessity" when they learned about the fuel leak. He stated that fuel leaks were common in the area, but also said that "irresponsibility" played a role in this incident.

== Investigation ==
Attorney General Alejandro Gertz Manero said there were indications that the incident was "deliberate". His position rested on the fact that the first incident, the leak, was intentional; however it was yet to be confirmed whether or not the explosion was deliberate. He stated that the investigation would be difficult because those involved in the incident died during the explosion. President López Obrador stated that all possibilities were being considered for the investigation, and did not discard the involvement of major criminal groups that operate in Hidalgo, like Los Zetas or the Jalisco New Generation Cartel, as well as local gasoline thieves not involved with major drug cartels.

The first hypothesis proposed by Gertz Manero's investigatory team was that the fire may have been caused by a static electricity spark product of the friction of people's synthetic clothes and the gases produced by the leak. The gasoline that was tapped into was a premium one with high octane levels, which produces lethal gases when exposed to the air. He stated that this hypothesis was not conclusive. To facilitate their investigations, the authorities stated they would step up legal proceedings to seize property involved in fuel thefts, including the land where the explosion occurred. The owners of the land said this measure was unfair and criticized the government's inability to stop fuel thieves.

On 21 January, Mexico's National Human Rights Commission (CNDH) received a complaint about the "inaction" of the Army during the events leading to the explosion. President López Obrador did not give more details to the press as to what the complaint consisted of and only confirmed it was issued. The CNDH confirmed the request and stated that they were going to question several personnel who were present during the explosion to gather more details on what exactly occurred. They clarified that this investigation did not mean the Army was at fault, and that that decision would be made after the investigation concluded and when more details on the causes of the explosion became known.

== Aftermath ==
On 8 May 2019, an illegal gasoline truck exploded in Reforma, Chiapas. Mayor Herminio Valdez Castillo said the explosion occurred in an uninhabited area and there were no victims. In January 2020, the Secretariat of the Interior (SEGOB) announced it would build a memorial for the 137 victims of the Tlahelipan explosion. Each family had earlier been compensated with MXN 15,000 (US$800).

== See also ==
- 1992 Guadalajara explosions
- 2010 Puebla oil pipeline explosion
- List of 21st-century explosions
