= Nigerian Red Cross Society =

National Red Cross Society in Nigeria

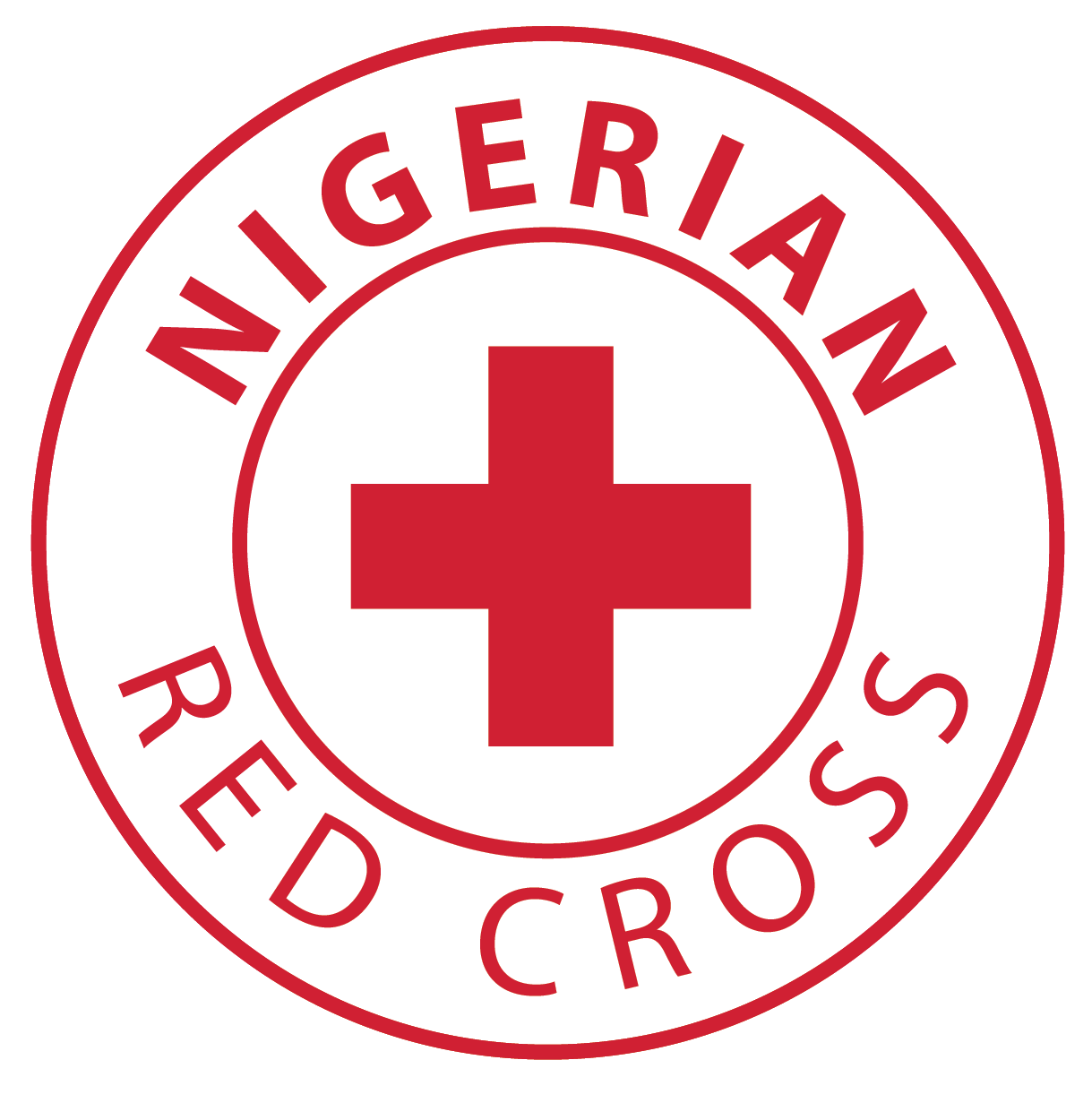
- Abbreviation: NRCS
- Formation: 1951; 75 years ago (as a branch of the British Red Cross); 1960; 66 years ago (as an independent Red Cross society)
- Type: Humanitarian organization
- Purpose: Humanitarian
- Headquarters: Plot 589, T.O.S. Benson Crescent, Utako District
- Location: Abuja, Nigeria
- Region served: Nigeria
- Affiliations: International Federation of Red Cross and Red Crescent Societies (IFRC), International Red Cross and Red Crescent Movement
- Website: redcrossnigeria.org

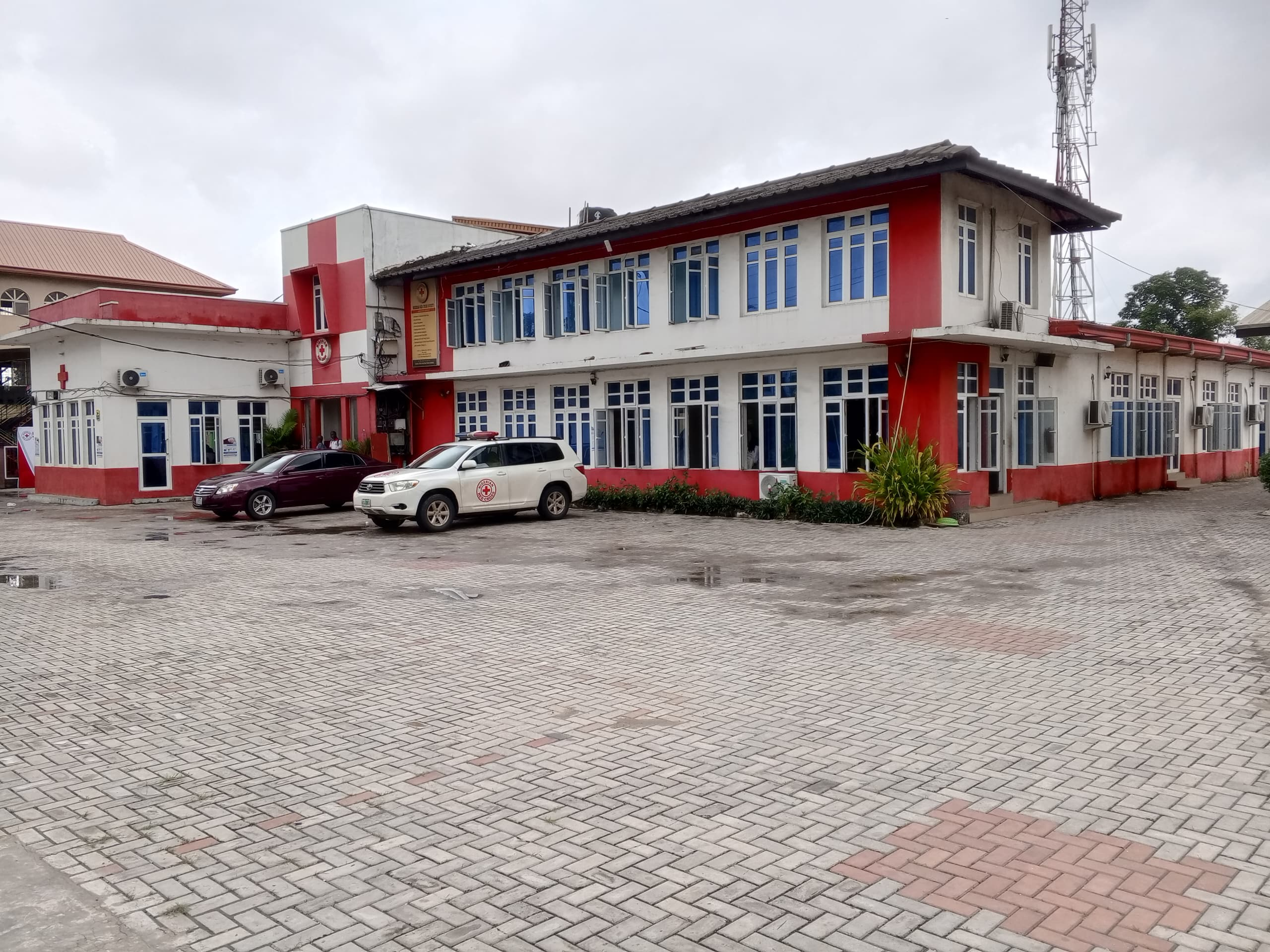
The Nigerian Red Cross Society Building

The Nigerian Red Cross Society (NRCS) was founded in 1960, and it has its headquarters in Abuja.

It has over 500,000 volunteers and 300 permanent employees. The Nigerian Red Cross Society was established by an Act of Parliament in 1960 and became the 86th Member – National Society of the League of Red Cross and Red Crescent Societies (Now International Federation of Red Cross and Red Crescent Societies) on 4 February 1961. The Nigerian Red Cross Society (NRCS) traces its roots back to the era when the British Red Cross operated in Nigeria. In 1960, following the country’s independence, the Nigerian Parliament enacted the Nigerian Red Cross Bill, officially establishing the NRCS as a distinct national organization. Since then, the Society has grown to become Nigeria’s largest humanitarian organization, with a volunteer base exceeding 800,000 individuals working across all 774 Local Government Areas of the country.

The NRCS is recognized under the Nigerian Red Cross Act of 1960 (CAP 324), which designates it as a Voluntary Aid Society auxiliary to public authorities. This legal foundation, in combination with Nigeria’s commitments under the Geneva Conventions, gives the NRCS a clear mandate to support public authorities during humanitarian emergencies. Over the years, the organization has remained at the forefront of disaster relief, health services, and community support, guided by its responsibility to assist those in need across Nigeria.

The Society is legally recognized as an auxiliary to public authorities in the humanitarian field, operating independently and in accordance with the fundamental principles of the Red Cross. Over the years, the Nigerian Red Cross Society has played a significant role in responding to crises such as disease outbreaks, natural disasters, and armed conflicts, providing critical support to vulnerable communities throughout Nigeria. Its driving seven fundamental principles are humanity, impartiality, neutrality, independence, voluntary service, unity and universality.
