= Gasoline theft =

When gasoline is stolen from a gas station, pipeline or vehicle

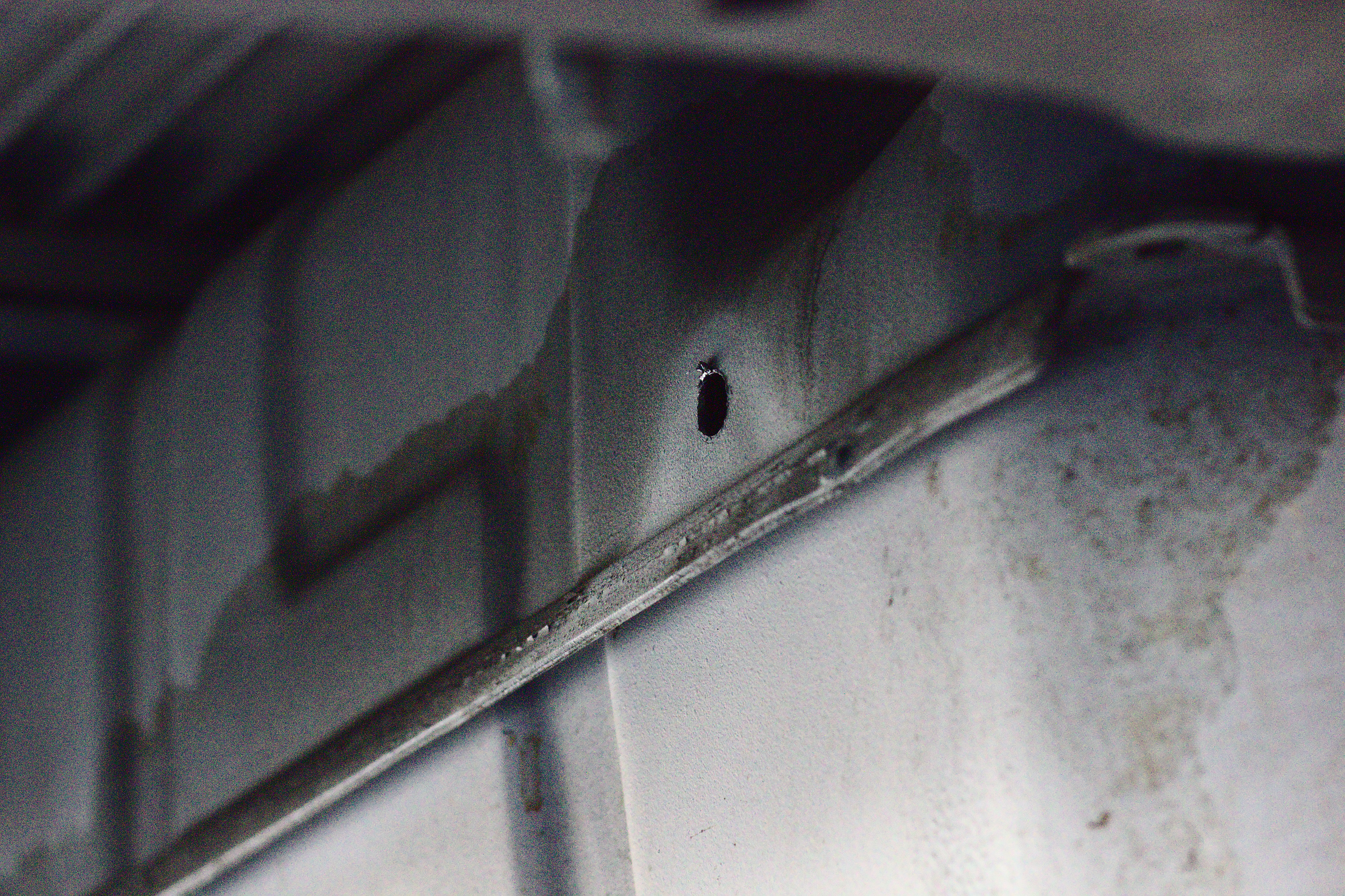
Gas tank of a rented moving truck with a drilled hole, used to siphon the gasoline

Gasoline theft occurs when gasoline is stolen from a gas station, pipeline or vehicle.

== From vehicle tanks ==
People can siphon fuel from fuel tanks or use special devices to remove gasoline from the fuel tank. Fuel theft has shown to amount to as high as $2.1 billion a year in the United States of America.

Vehicle tracking systems are sometimes used by companies to monitor cases of fuel theft and to raise effectiveness of commercial fleet fuel usage.

== From filling stations ==
Gasoline theft (sometimes known colloquially as fill and fly, gas and dash, and drive-off in the US and bilking in the UK) is the removal of gasoline from a station without payment. The thief will usually use some form of decoy to prevent nearby witnesses from noticing the lack of payment until they have left the station. Common decoys include pretending to press the wrong buttons after the credit card are swiped or having multiple people get gas at the same time, with one paying for another person and the other running off with both cars.

With typical gas thefts costing station owners in the range of $50 per incident, many stores have fought back by installing better video equipment and requiring prepayment.

Since the oil price increases after 2004, a surge in fuel theft has occurred, which has included license plate thefts (when gasoline is stolen with the vehicle having the original tags and the vehicle tags identifying the registered owner).

== From pipelines ==
Oil and gasoline are stolen by illegal taps in petroleum pipelines, and billions of dollars worth of product are stolen annually. Targets are the petroleum industry in Nigeria, the Nembe Creek Trunk Line, the Ceyhan-Kırıkkale Oil Pipeline, and the petroleum industry in Mexico.

Organized crime and local people are often involved.

Illegal taps have caused leaks and explosions such as the following:

- 2006 Abule Egba pipeline explosion
- 2006 Atlas Creek pipeline explosion
- 2019 Tlahuelilpan pipeline explosion

== See also ==
- 2010 South Kivu tank truck explosion
- Cap-Haïtien fuel tanker explosion
- Motor vehicle theft
