= 2010 Puebla oil pipeline explosion =

Oil pipeline explosion in Mexico

Coordinates: 19.2836°N 98.4334°W

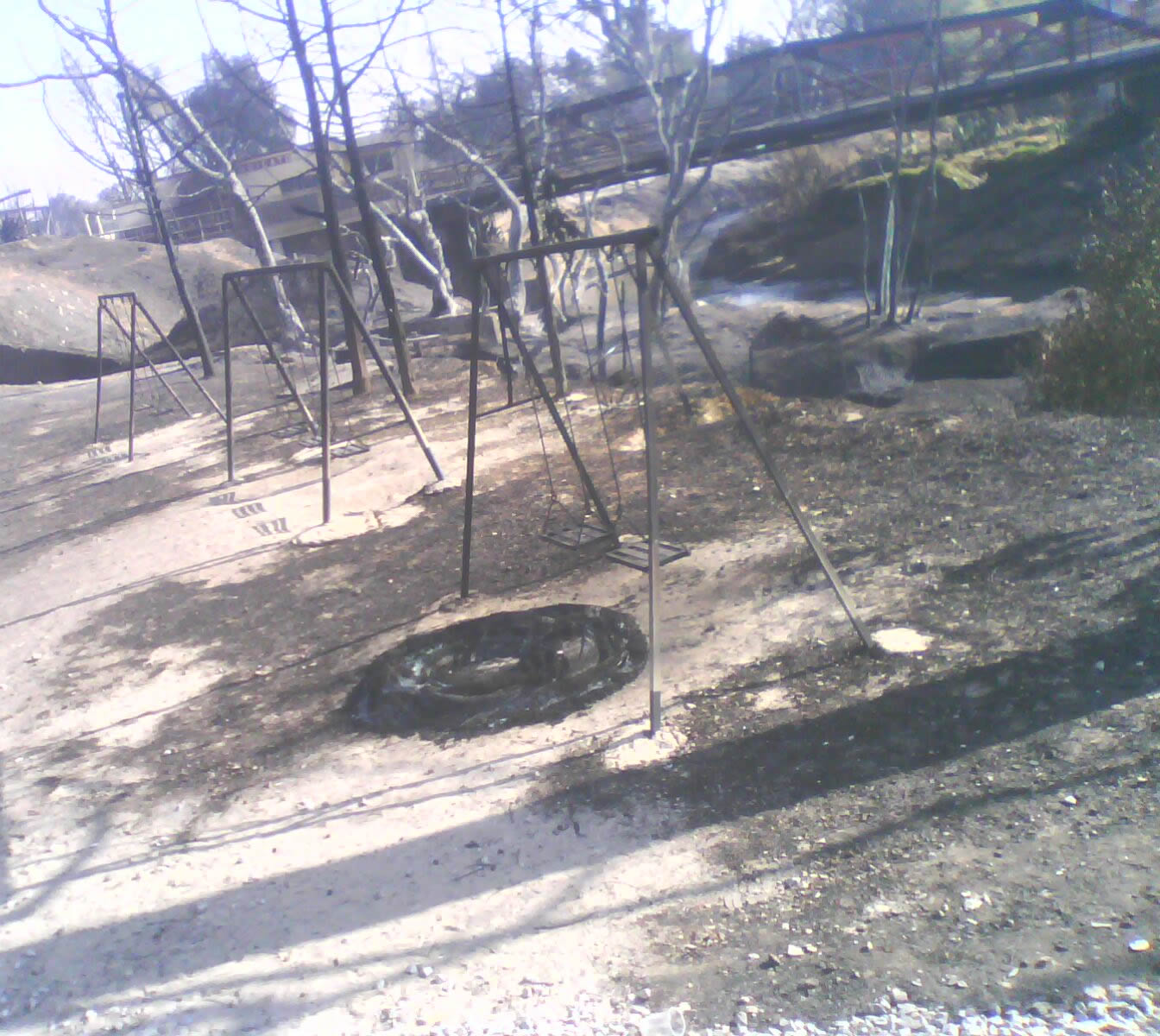

The 2010 Puebla oil pipeline explosion was a large oil pipeline explosion that occurred at 5:50 am CST on December 19, 2010, in the city of San Martín Texmelucan de Labastida, Puebla, Mexico. The pipeline, running from Tabasco to Hidalgo, was owned by the Pemex petroleum company, and exploded after thieves from the Los Zetas drug cartel attempted to siphon off the oil. The gas explosion and resulting oil fire killed 29 people, including 13 children, and injured 52. Some of the flames in the fire became ten metres high, and the smoke towered over the city. The blast also damaged 115 homes, completely destroying 32 of them, and prompted the evacuation of 5,000 residents. Firefighters eventually controlled the blaze, but electricity and water remained cut following the explosions, and the military was deployed to the site. Mexican President Felipe Calderón visited the explosion site on the day of the incident to offer condolences to the victims' families. The fire was one of the deadliest in Mexican history, largely destroying an area of five-kilometre radius, and some oil may have polluted the Atoyac River.

== Background ==
The Los Zetas gang, one of the most powerful drug cartels and paramilitary groups involved in the ongoing Mexican drug war, was blamed for the explosion. Throughout 2010, drug-related conflicts had killed 12,456 people. In 2008, Pemex reported 9.3 billion pesos (USD750 million) of oil lost to thieves. Previously, close to 60 illegal tapping incidents occurred near the explosion site due to thieves stealing the oil. Much of the stolen oil is often trafficked to the United States.

== Investigation ==
Felipe Calderón ordered an official investigation into the incident. A hole was found at the pipeline, and several bodies lay near the initial site of the explosion. The cause of the spark that led to the explosion is still unknown. The investigation is to include an assessment of the environmental impact of the explosion, including the pollution of downstream reservoirs. Mechanical failure was not ruled out as a possible cause of the oil leak despite evidence of theft and tampering of the pipeline. The pipeline was re-opened on December 22.
