= Santa Cruz de Juventino Rosas =

Coordinates: 20°39′00″N 101°00′00″W

- City and municipality
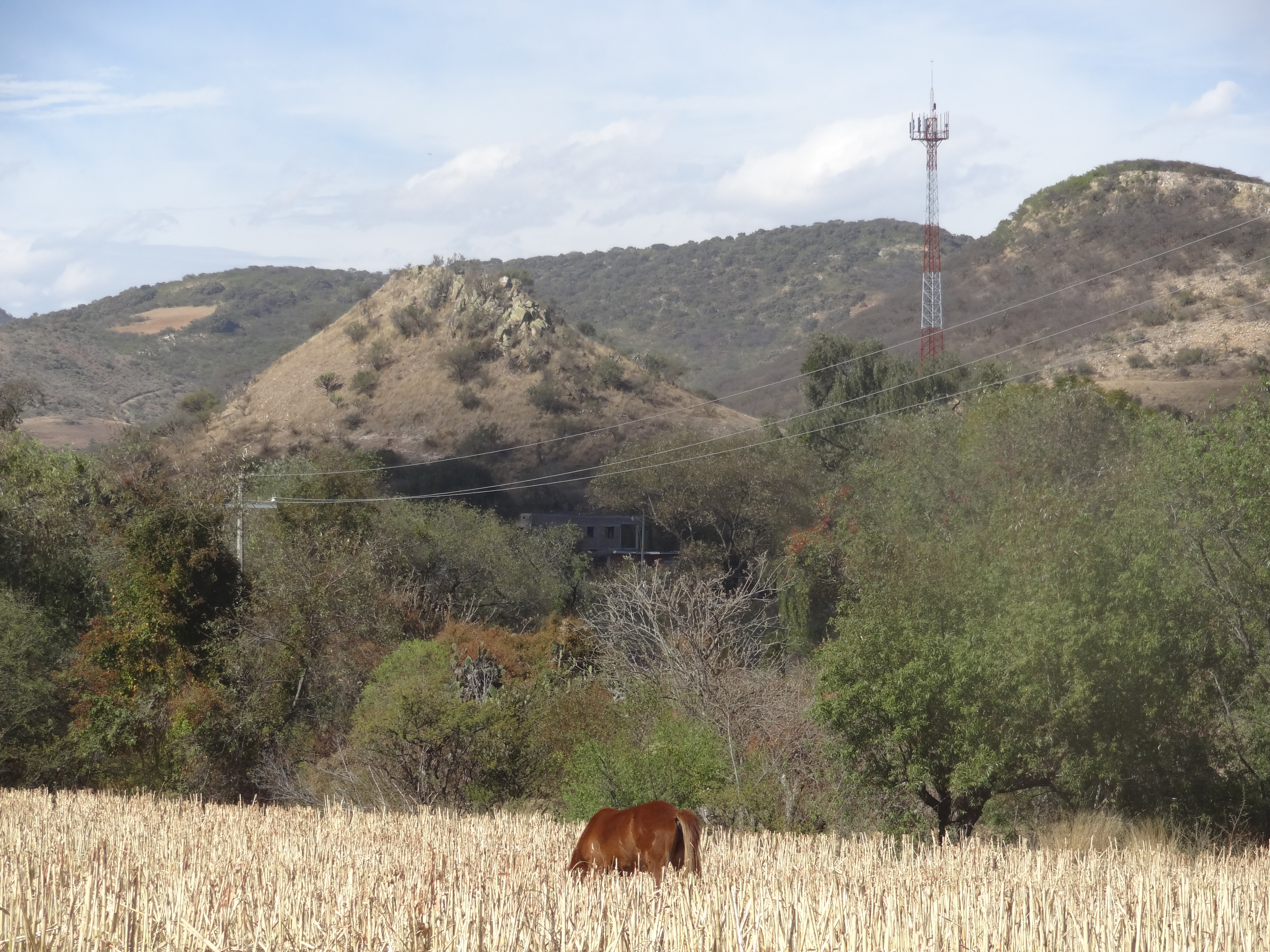

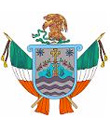
- Coat of arms

- Location in Guanajuato Santa Cruz de Juventino Rosas (Mexico)
- Country: Mexico
- State: Guanajuato

Population (2020)
  - Municipality: 82,340
- Time zone: UTC−6 (CST)

Santa Cruz de Juventino Rosas is a Mexican city (and municipality) located in the central east region of the state of Guanajuato. The municipality has an area of 428.64 square kilometres (1.40% of the surface of the state) and is bordered to the north by San Miguel de Allende, to the northeast by Comonfort, to the southeast by Celaya, to the south by Villagrán, and to the west by Salamanca. The municipality had a population of 65,479 inhabitants according to the 2005 census.

Santa Cruz received its name 1719 and by order of Spanish viceroy Baltazar de Zúñiga was given the status of village in 1721. Its current name of Santa Cruz de Juventino Rosas was adopted in 1939 in honor of Juventino Rosas, a Mexican composer, violinist, and band leader who was born in the town.

The municipal president of Santa Cruz de Juventino Rosas and its many smaller outlying communities is Juan Antonio Acosta Cano.

The main outlying communities in the municipality are Santiago Cuenda, Rincón de Centeno, Pozos, Morales, and Franco Tavera.

Juan Antonio Acosta Cano (PAN), deputy in the Congress of Guanajuato and precandidate for municipal president was shot and killed on January 12, 2021.
