= Emergency medical services in Belgium =

Emergency medical services in Belgium (Dutch: dringende geneeskundige hulpverlening, French: aide médicale urgente, German: dringende medizinische Hilfe) (Note: The translation of certain terminology can be looked up in the three official languages of Belgium (Dutch, French and German) in the SEMAMDY-database maintained by the Central service for German translation of the Belgian federal government.) are commonly available throughout the country. In Belgium, the provision of prehospital emergency medical services (EMS) is assured by a network of various public and private (both non-profit and for-profit) organizations. The EMS system as a whole is overseen by Belgium's federal government, primarily by the FPS Health and the federal minister of Health. An EMS intervention typically starts by placing a call to one of the country's emergency call centres (PSAPs) through the 112 telephone number. The emergency call centre then sends the most appropriate EMS resources to the patient. After on-scene care, the patient will typically be transported to the emergency department (ED) of a hospital for further treatment. The responsibility of the Belgian EMS system ends with the receiving hospital taking charge of the patient.

== History ==
=== First ambulance services ===
After World War I, motorized ambulances made their entry into Belgian civilian life. Various competing public and private organizations, such as health insurers, hospitals, municipal governments and the Red Cross, started providing ambulance services to their respective clients or populations, or concluded contracts with other parties to this end. Centralized control over or dispatching of ambulances did not exist yet; neither was access to ambulance services guaranteed in case of an emergency, especially in the more rural areas of Belgium. Hospitals were also under no obligation to admit emergency patients transported to them, impelling some of them to turn away those presumed (un)able to pay. Faced with a rising number of traffic accidents as well as a polio epidemic in the 1950s, this lack of structuring of emergency medical services was deemed increasingly untenable.

=== Foundation of the 900-system ===
This compelled the Belgian central government to take material and legislative measures from the late 1950s to the mid-1960s to ensure the availability of emergency medical services throughout the country. The responsibility to organize emergency medical services was first assigned to the municipalities, but due to many of them being unable to properly execute this duty, the central government changed tactics and started taking up a major role itself. A first step was to designate the number '900' as a national emergency telephone number. Calls to this number were to be answered by call centres installed in several municipal fire services. These call centres were then to dispatch a physician to provide on-scene care, or an ambulance to transport the patient to the closest public or private hospital. They could resort to the ambulances belonging to public authorities and those operated by private providers who concluded a contract with the Belgian government. Hospitals, physicians and ambulances in this 900-system were placed under the positive obligation to provide care to and to transport patients. Lastly, the Belgian government invested in a large number of standardized ambulance vehicles which were lent by the country's health ministry to the various services active in the system. The 900-system made Belgium the first country in the world with a uniform nationwide emergency telephone number. It should be noted however that the initial scope of the 900-system was limited to patients in public spaces. Despite this formal limitation, soon after its conception a significant amount of calls made to the system concerned patients in private places. Though it was not prohibited for actors in the 900-system to respond to calls for these patients, they were not given the same legal guarantees as patients in public places.

=== Prehospital physicians and nurses ===
For practical reasons, the option to send a physician to the scene was little used by the call centres, and most calls were handled by sending an ambulance to transport the patient to a hospital. Due to the non-existent training requirements for ambulance attendants at the time, the level of prehospital care provided by the ambulances was generally low. In order to try to remedy the latter, hospital-associated ambulances staffed by physicians and/or nurses were introduced in some Belgian cities starting from 1965. These medicalized ambulances were commonly referred to as 'resuscitation ambulances' (Dutch: reanimatiewagen, French: ambulance de réanimation, German: Reanimationswagen). Some areas also saw experiments with medical helicopters, which were however not prolongedly sustained. Starting from the late 1970s, some hospitals changed their approach and would send a medical team to the patient in their own response vehicle separate from an ambulance, instead of them directly staffing or being picked up by an ambulance. More hospitals would follow suit later on. The advent of such self-standing prehospital medical teams prompted changes in the standardized ambulance model to provide more room for onboard treatment by their medical personnel. Later on, the name 'mobile emergency service' (Dutch: MUG, mobiele urgentiegroep, French: SMUR, service mobile d'urgence, German: MRD, mobiler Rettungsdienst) would be officially chosen for these medical teams.

=== 900 becomes 100 ===
For technical reasons, the emergency telephone number '900' was changed to '100' in 1987. This change did not detract from the fact that the Belgian EMS system as a whole was well-established by then. This public recognition however also led to a rising number of frivolous calls, which subsequently led to an increased demand in proper triaging of these calls to avoid overloading the system. Some other abuses and shortcomings within the system also started to receive negative publicity, such as the low level of training of ambulance attendants and the creep of commercial interests. Partly as a result, the 1990s would see many legislative and regulatory initiatives to promote the quality and efficiency of the system. By the end of the 1980s, the country had also been confronted with large disasters such as the Heysel Stadium disaster and the capsizing of the Herald of Free Enterprise. These events in turn spurred the nationwide rollout of plans for mass casualty incidents, as well as the development of a national radio communication network adapted to emergency services under the name 'NATINUL' (Dutch) or 'RINSIS' (French).

=== Regulation and rationalization ===
To try promote a more justified use of EMS resources, experiments were conducted in some areas around 1990 where physicians oversaw or assisted in the EMS dispatching conducted by the (fire) personnel staffing the call centres, or where general practitioners were sent to calls deemed to not require an ambulance response. None of these experiments proved lasting. The 1990s furthermore brought the legal recognition of emergency medicine, emergency nursing and emergency medical technician (EMT) as a medical specialty, nursing specialty and regulated profession respectively. EMTs or literally translated 'rescuer-ambulancers' (Dutch: hulpverlener-ambulancier, French: secouriste-ambulancier, German: Sanitäter-Krankenwagenfahrer) were from then on mandated to follow a 160-hour training and obtain professional certification. New regulations and standards were also issued for the various services and hospitals active in the system regarding staffing, equipment and organization, vehicle appearance, and the fees charged to patients, amongst others. Some regulations concerning hospital EDs and MUG-SMUR services were additionally meant to try to limit their total number in order to induce a rationalization. A national EMS council as well as EMS commissions in all Belgian provinces were founded in respectively 1994 and 1998, to serve as consultative bodies and to make arrangements in their respective jurisdictions regarding the functioning of the system. Lastly, the official limitation of the scope of the Belgian EMS system to patients in public places was lifted at the end of the 1990s, widening it to all patients requiring emergency treatment regardless of the circumstances.

== Literature ==
- Santkin J, Du Jardin J, Prims A, Calle P, Buylaert W, Dewallens F, Corne L, Decoster C, Verhoeven A, Delooz H, Tytgat R, Duvillier G (1995). Prims A, De Ruyver B, Guldix E, Vansweevelt T (eds.). De wetgeving inzake dringende geneeskundige hulpverlening [The legislation regarding emergency medical services] (PDF). Reeks Recht en Gezondheidszorg – No. 2 (in Dutch). Ghent: Mys & Breesch. ISBN 978-90-5462-108-9 – via KU Leuven Bibliotheken.
- Vandeputte, C. (2015). Vanhessche, J. (ed.). De geschiedenis van de dringende geneeskundige hulpverlening in België (Deel I) [The history of the emergency medical services in Belgium (Part I)] (in Dutch). Avelgem, Belgium: Chris Vandeputte. ISBN 978-90-82424-70-6.
- Vandeputte, C.; Vanhessche, J. (2017). De geschiedenis van de dringende geneeskundige hulpverlening in België (Deel II) [The history of the emergency medical services in Belgium (Part II)] (in Dutch). Avelgem, Belgium: Chris Vandeputte. ISBN 978-90-82424-71-3.
- De Nutte, H.; et al., eds. (2016). Wanneer zorg niet planbaar is: Toekomstvisie op de dringende geneeskundige hulpverlening en de spoeddiensten [When care is not plannable: Future vision of the emergency medical services and the emergency departments] (PDF) (in Dutch). Brussels, Belgium: Zorgnet-Icuro. ISBN 978-94-91323-23-2. Archived (PDF) from the original on 4 October 2022.
