= Pommes Frites =

Coordinates: 40.730023°N 74.000143°W

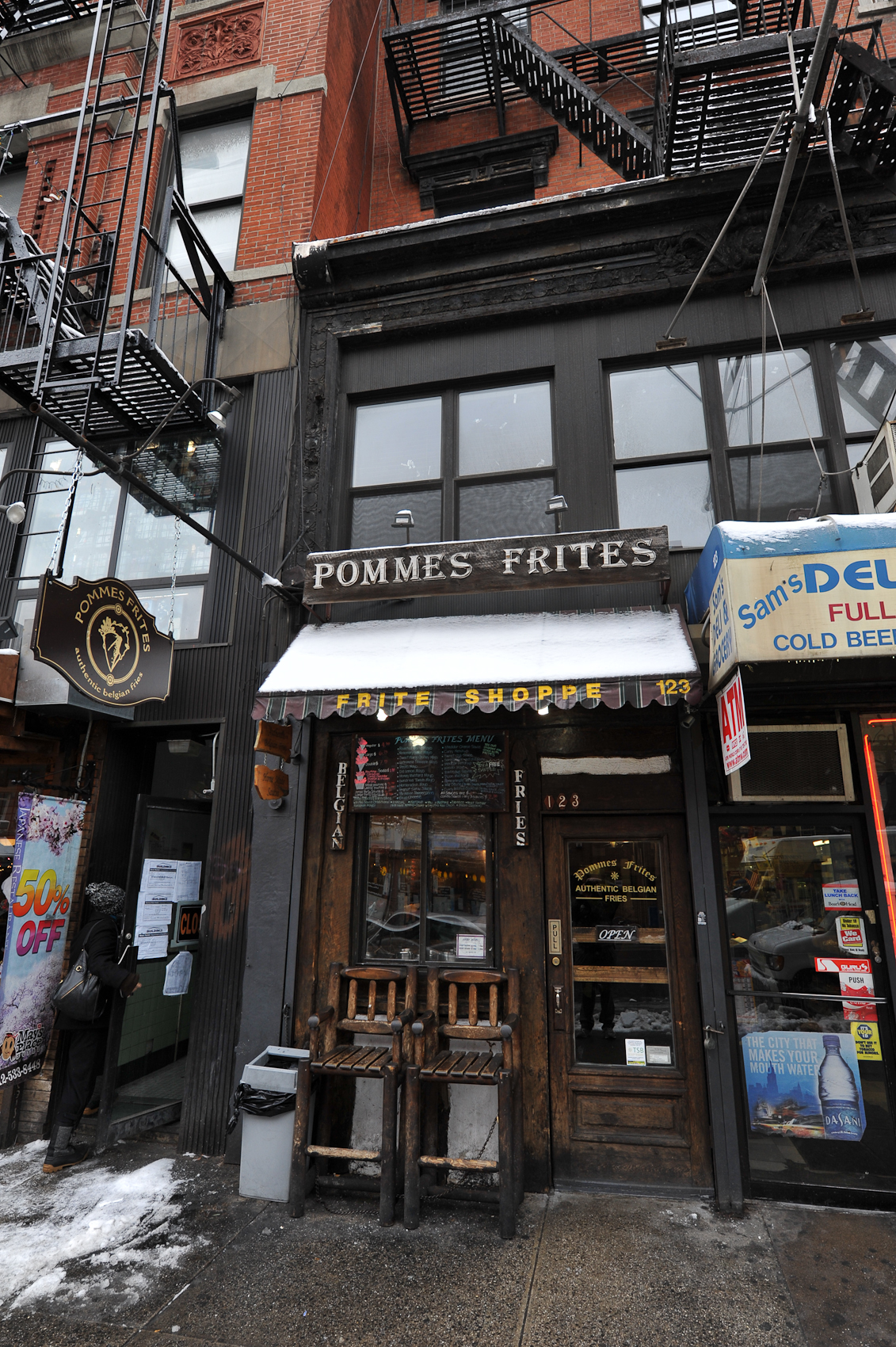
- Original (2nd Ave) store
- Interactive map of Pommes Frites

Restaurant information
- Established: January 1997
- Owner(s): Suzanne Levinson, Omer Shorshi
- Food type: French fries
- Location: New York City, New York, United States
- Website: http://www.pommesfritesnyc.com/

Pommes Frites is a New York City restaurant which specializes in Belgian-style fries. The restaurant was located in the East Village at 123 2nd Avenue (near 7th Street), but relocated to 128 MacDougal Street after the original building was destroyed in a 2015 natural gas explosion.

== History ==
The shop was opened by Suzanne Levinson, a Bronx native, in January 1997 after returning from a backpacking trip through the Low Countries. (At the time of its destruction, she co-owned the restaurant with Omer Shorshi.) Nine months after it opened, New York Magazine reported that there were lines outside the restaurant every day. At one time, the restaurant had expanded to two locations, as well a copycat restaurant under the same name with a different owner, but by 2013 only the original location remained.

== Gas explosion ==
On March 26, 2015, the restaurant was destroyed when the building which housed it collapsed, following a natural gas explosion. No Pommes Frites customers or employees were seriously injured, although an employee and a customer of another nearby restaurant were killed. Pommes Frites reopened on May 23, 2016.

== Menu ==
The restaurant sells only one food item: fries, served in paper cones, with a variety of sauces to choose from. Fries are prepared in the Belgian style, deep fried twice at two different temperatures. The fries, which can be served plain or styled as greek or truffle fries, come in regular, large, and 'double' sizes. Poutine, which is sold in regular and 'Poutine for 2' sizes, is sold either with or without 'impossible' plant-based meat. Additionally, a variety of European beers, soft drinks, and fruit smoothies are offered as beverages.
