= 1998 St. Cloud explosion =

1998 Gas Explosion in Minnesota, US

Coordinates: 45°33′37″N 94°09′47″W

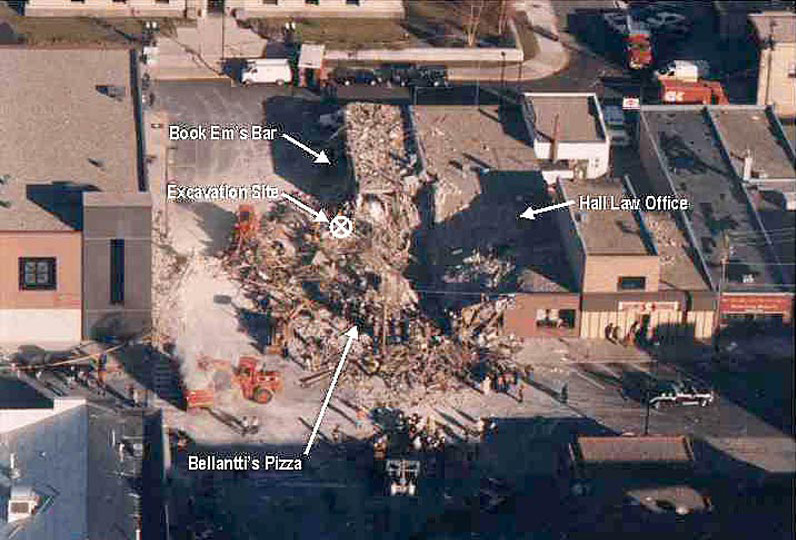
- An aerial photo of the accident site following the explosion
- Date: December 11, 1998; 27 years ago
- Location: St. Cloud, Minnesota, U.S.
- Deaths: 4
- Injuries: 11

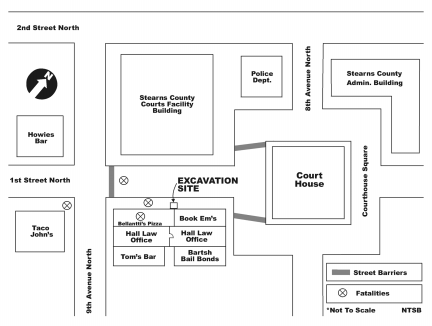
An NTSB diagram of the accident site

The 1998 St. Cloud explosion was a gas explosion that occurred in St. Cloud, Minnesota on December 11, 1998. A work crew installing fiber-optic cable punctured an underground natural gas pipeline, causing the explosion. The blast killed four people, injured 11, and destroyed five buildings. The total damage was estimated at $399,000.

An NTSB report on the incident faulted the safety and emergency practices of Cable Constructors, Inc., whose employees punctured the gas line, and the procedures and training of the St. Cloud fire department for responding to gas leaks.

== Timeline of events ==
- Approximately 10:15 a.m. - the CCI work crew punctures the underground gas pipeline
- Approximately 10:51 a.m. - the CCI foreman contacts his supervisor to report the leak
- 11:05 a.m. - the facilities director of the Stearns County Administrative Building places a call to the county chief deputy sheriff after investigating the gas smell and being told by CCI that the leak had occurred
- 11:06 a.m. - St. Cloud fire department Engine Company 326 is dispatched to the scene, St. Cloud police units 9201 and 9202 are assigned to crowd control at the site
- 11:16 a.m. - two NSP trucks arrive
- 11:29 a.m. - an unknown source ignites the gas, causing the explosion
