= Firefighting in Belgium =

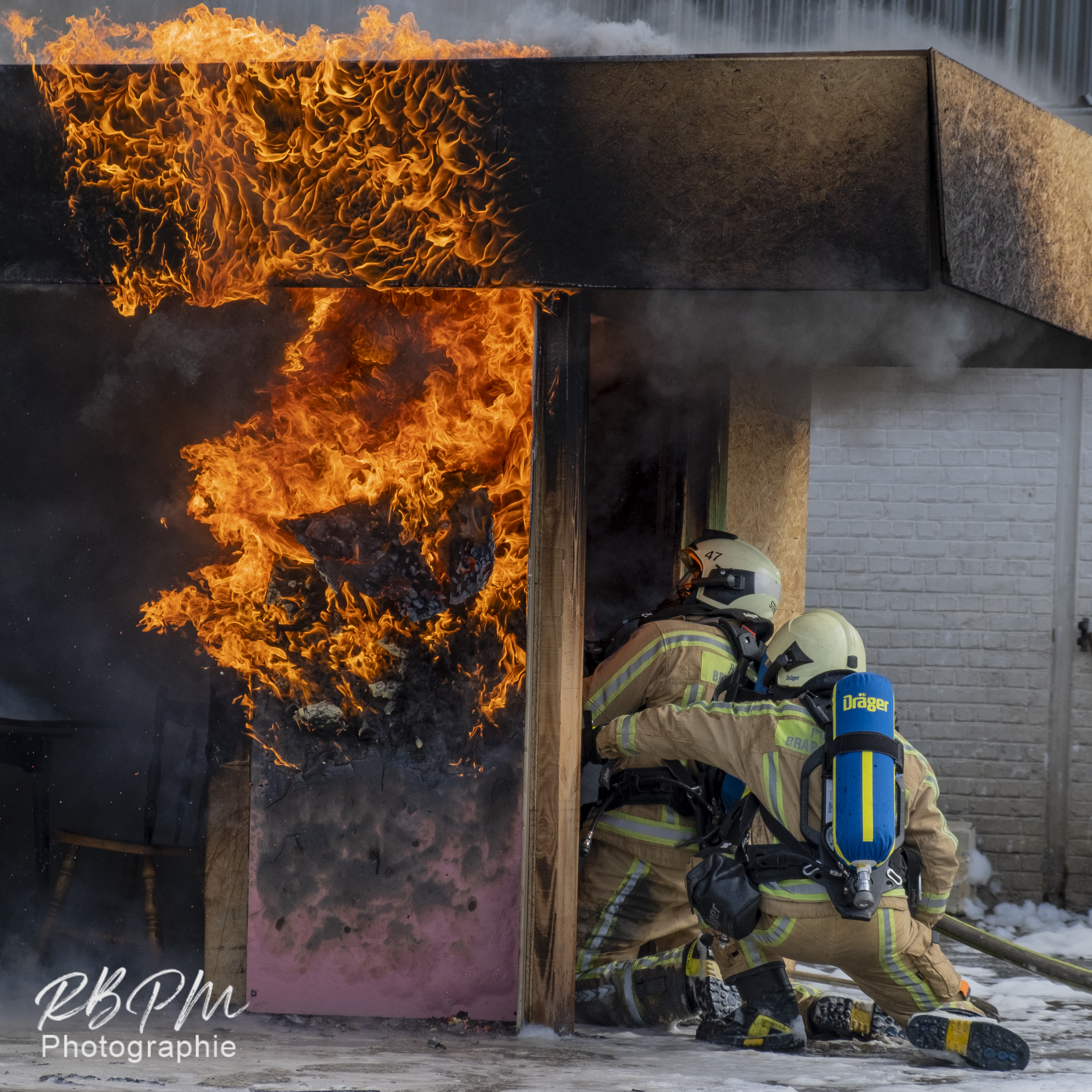
Belgian firefighters performing a firefighting demonstration (2019).

In Belgium organized public fire services (Dutch: brandweer, French: service d'incendie, German: Feuerwehr) are available everywhere in the country. The responsibility to provide general firefighting and rescue services resides with 34 public authorities called 'fire zones', or literally translated 'emergency rescue zones' (Dutch: hulpverleningszone, French: zone de secours, German: Hilfeleistungszone). The Brussels Capital Region is protected by the Brussels Fire and Emergency Medical Service (Dutch: DBDMH, Dienst voor Brandbestrijding en Dringende Medische Hulp; French: SIAMU, Service d'Incendie et l'Aide Medicale Urgente), which has its own legal status. Together the 34 fire zones and the Brussels Fire and Emergency Medical Service employ about 17,000 firefighters in total according to 2018 figures, and as of 2023 maintain 320 fire stations spread over the entire Belgian territory. In case of emergency, the response of Belgian fire services can be obtained through the 112 emergency telephone number.

The jurisdiction over the organisation and regulation of the fire services lies with the Directorate-General Civil Security of Belgium's FPS Interior. This does not apply however to the provision of emergency medical services, which falls under the jurisdiction of the Directorate-General Health Care of the FPS Health, Food Chain Safety and Environment.

== History of fire services ==
=== Before the 2000s ===
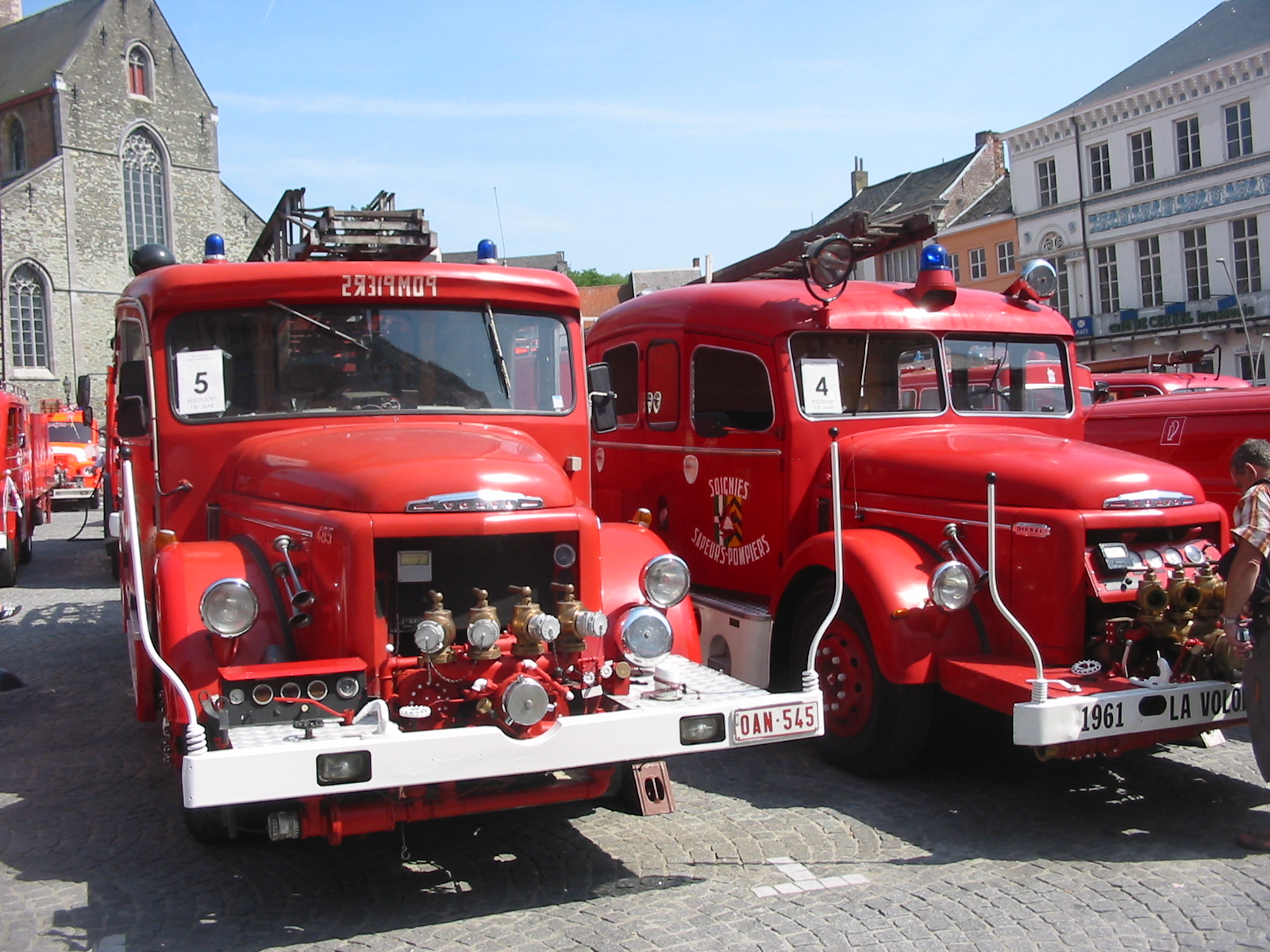
Oldtimer fire engines on display in 2006.

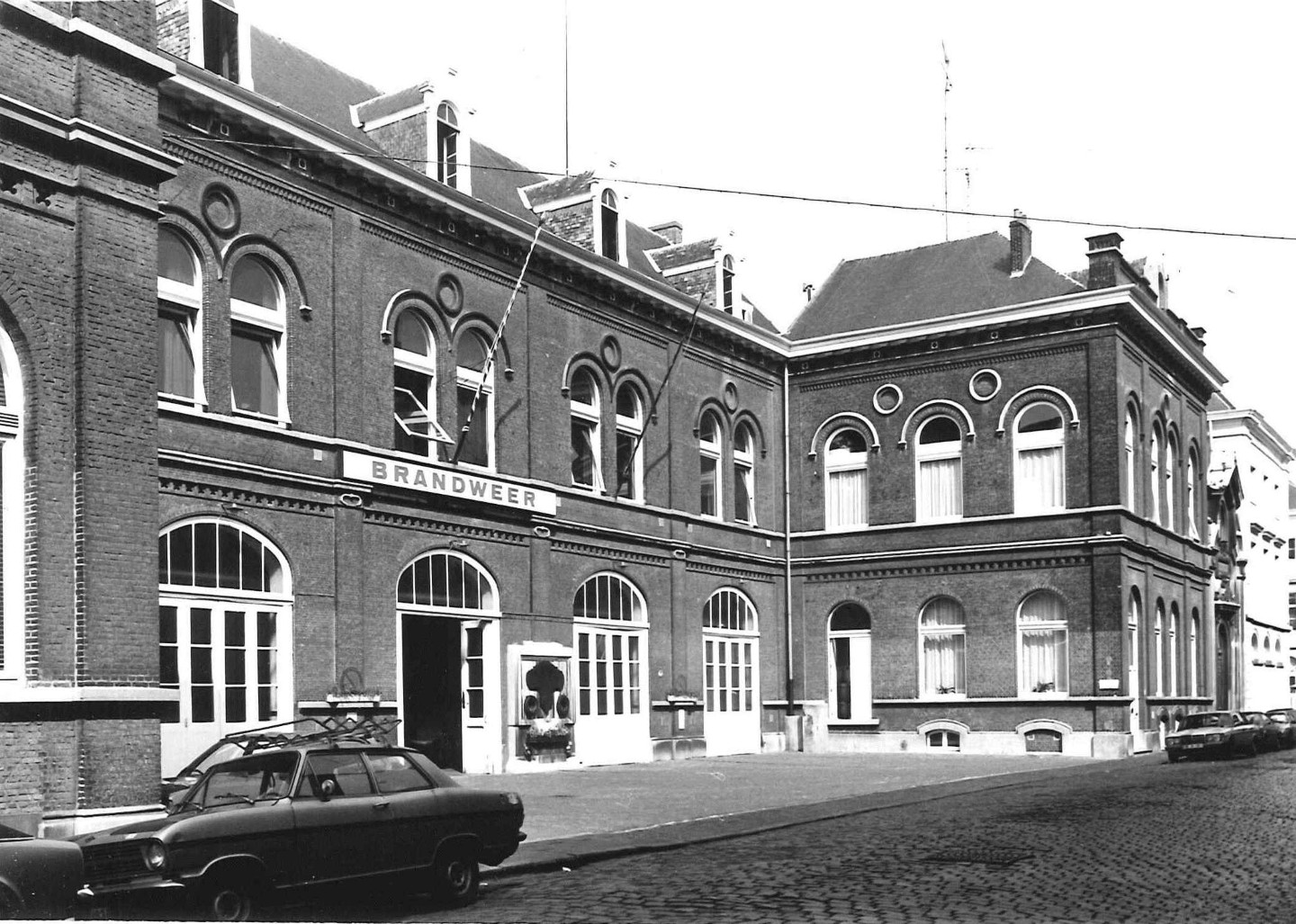
Old fire station of the Ghent city fire service (1977).

The history of fire services in Belgium predates the foundation of the country, since local municipalities had been given the statutory authority and duty to prevent and repress fires in the late 18th century. Municipalities were entirely free in how they undertook this responsibility, and whether or not to maintain a fire service. This approach changed during the interwar period, when in the context of a new looming war the Belgian government in 1935 required every municipality either to establish their own fire service or either to contract with another municipality for fire service coverage. In the 1960s, this time in the context of the Cold War period, a new national legal framework was adopted related to the organization of municipal fire services and the Civil Protection units maintained by the national government. This new framework introduced a classification of municipalities with regards to the requirements placed on their fire services, new forms of optional and mandatory cooperation between these services, minimum standards concerning equipment and staffing, and subsidy mechanisms for purchasing equipment.

=== Ghislenghien disaster ===
This framework for fire services organized on a municipal basis remained largely in place until the Ghislenghien gas explosion in 2004. This explosion took the lives of twenty-four people, including five firefighters. In the wake of the disaster, the organization of the fire services was deemed to be no longer suited for modern times and modern risks. To prepare a reform, a commission was created chaired by the then governor of the province of Antwerp Camille Paulus. This commission put forward three key points for the reform:

1. Citizens have the right to the fastest adequate assistance regardless of borders and jurisdictions;
2. Every citizen has the right to the same basic protection against an equivalent financial contribution;
3. Upscaling is necessary to achieve a more efficient use of resources and better handling of large incidents.

=== New civil security framework ===
These principles were incorporated in a new law on civil security, promulgated in 2007. This law provided for the creation of new public bodies called emergency rescue zones (fire zones), which would each be composed of a number of municipalities by analogy to the police zones in Belgium. Notwithstanding some exceptions, they would be governed by a council formed by the mayors of each constituent municipality. Their funding would primarily come from contributions of each municipality and from grants from the Belgian federal government. Each municipality was required to become a part of a fire zone, regardless of whether they had their own fire service or not. The existing municipal fire services had to merge into these new zones. This major reform was only fully implemented by 1 January 2016, when the last new fire zones finally became active. The Brussels Fire and Emergency Medical Service was largely exempted from this reform, since it already enjoyed its own specific legal status as a public body managed by the Brussels regional government.

== Fire zones ==
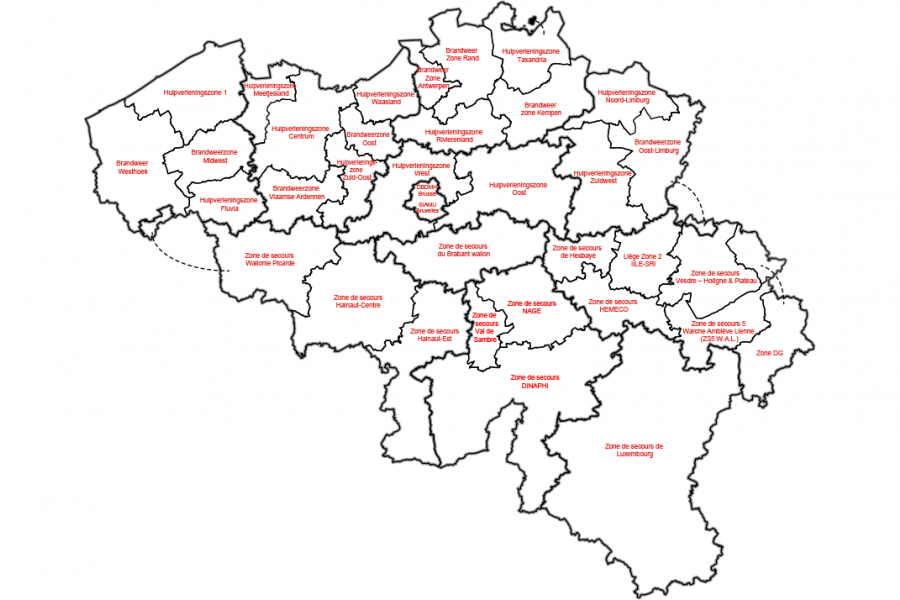
Map of the Belgian fire zones.

As stated before, fire zones (officially 'emergency rescue zones') are public bodies composed of multiple constituent municipalities. Bar some exceptions, they are governed by a council in which the mayor of each municipality has a seat. Their funding comes primarily from their constituent municipalities and from the Belgian federal government. The fire zones each manage a network of fire stations, with assigned firefighters and fire apparatus, from which firefighting and rescue operations are carried out. The fire zones also have duties related to fire safety and fire prevention, and most zones take on a role in the provision of emergency medical services as well. On the operational level, each fire zone is headed by a zone commander. The fire zones differ from each other on several points, such as their size, the risks present in their jurisdiction, and whether they are a volunteer, combination or career-only organisation.

=== List ===
Below is a table containing a list of all of the 34 fire zones as well as the Brussels Fire and Emergency Medical Service. In this table, the column '# M' lists the number of municipalities encompassed by each zone, the column '# S' lists the number of fire stations in each zone, and '# I' lists the total number of (non-EMS) interventions carried out by each zone:

Province or region	Native name	Area		Population (on 2022-01-01)	# M	# S	# I (2020)
Province or region	Native name	sq mi	km²	Population (on 2022-01-01)	# M	# S	# I (2020)
Brussels	DBDMH (Dutch) or SIAMU (French)	62.71	162.42	1,222,637	19	8	14,707
Antwerp	Brandweer Zone Antwerpen	89.75	232.44	560,117	3	8	14,535
Antwerp	Brandweerzone Rivierenland	219.70	569.03	430,901	18	15	14,524
Antwerp	Brandweer Zone Rand	275.91	714.61	424,365	21	20	7,043
Antwerp	Hulpverleningszone Taxandria	243.82	631.50	201,025	12	12	7,655
Antwerp	Brandweer Zone Kempen	281.29	728.53	270,201	15	7	7,235
Flemish Brabant	Hulpverleningszone Oost Vlaams-Brabant	476.34	1,233.71	546,949	32	8	12,864
Flemish Brabant	Brandweerzone Vlaams-Brabant West	341.56	884.64	626,491	33	9	14,250
Walloon Brabant	Zone de Secours du Brabant wallon	423.63	1,097.20	409,782	27	5	6,767
East Flanders	Brandweerzone Vlaamse Ardennen	204.24	528.98	175,619	12	8	6,613
East Flanders	Brandweerzone Centrum	359.49	931.08	567,287	18	14	9,875
East Flanders	Brandweerzone Oost	111.87	289.75	185,259	7	7	5,585
East Flanders	Hulpverleningszone Zuid-Oost	177.46	459.63	299,616	11	9	11,028
East Flanders	Hulpverleningszone Waasland	171.25	443.53	227,081	7	9	4,820
East Flanders	Hulpverleningszone Meetjesland	136.72	354.101	89,003	5	4	1,865
Hainaut	Zone de secours Hainaut Centre	528.04	1,367.63	556,543	28	11	N/A
Hainaut	Zone de Secours Hainaut-Est	479.84	1,242.77	474,436	22	6	9,408
Hainaut	Zone de Secours de Wallonie Picarde	464.26	1,202.43	320,148	19	7	7,418
Liège	Zone de secours Hesbaye	150.61	390.07	76,663	13	2	1,836
Liège	Zone de Secours HEMECO	231.30	599.08	106,423	15	2	2,474
Liège	Liège Zone 2 IILE-SRI	227.94	590.36	565,529	21	7	8,563
Liège	Zone de secours 5 Warche-Amblève-Lienne	244.28	632.69	49,468	7	4	1,536
Liège	Zone de Secours Vesdre-Hoëgne & Plateau	308.41	798.79	234,302	19	9	3,516
Liège	Hilfeleistungszone DG	326.70	846.14	78,604	9	7	1,080
Limburg	Brandweerzone Oost-Limburg	341.64	884.83	324,729	14	8	5,968
Limburg	Hulpverleningszone Noord-Limburg	221.38	573.36	168,701	9	4	5,555
Limburg	Hulpverleningszone Zuid-West Limburg	374.22	969.24	392,521	19	8	15,242
Luxembourg	Zone de Secours Luxembourg	1,721.73	4,459.25	291,143	44	17	7,213
Namur Province	Zone de Secours DINAPHI	968.01	2,507.12	178,975	22	12	6,391
Namur Province	Zone de secours NAGE	320.93	831.20	232,709	10	4	5,541
Namur Province	Zone de secours Val de Sambre	129.92	336.50	87,770	6	3	2,518
West Flanders	Hulpverleningszone Zone 1	377.55	977.86	441,554	17	11	10,456
West Flanders	Brandweer Westhoek	466.00	1,206.93	220,785	18	22	7,034
West Flanders	Hulpverleningszone Fluvia	174.86	452.89	315,636	14	16	4,451
West Flanders	Brandweerzone Midwest	215.80	558.91	231,036	15	17	5,985

== Activities ==
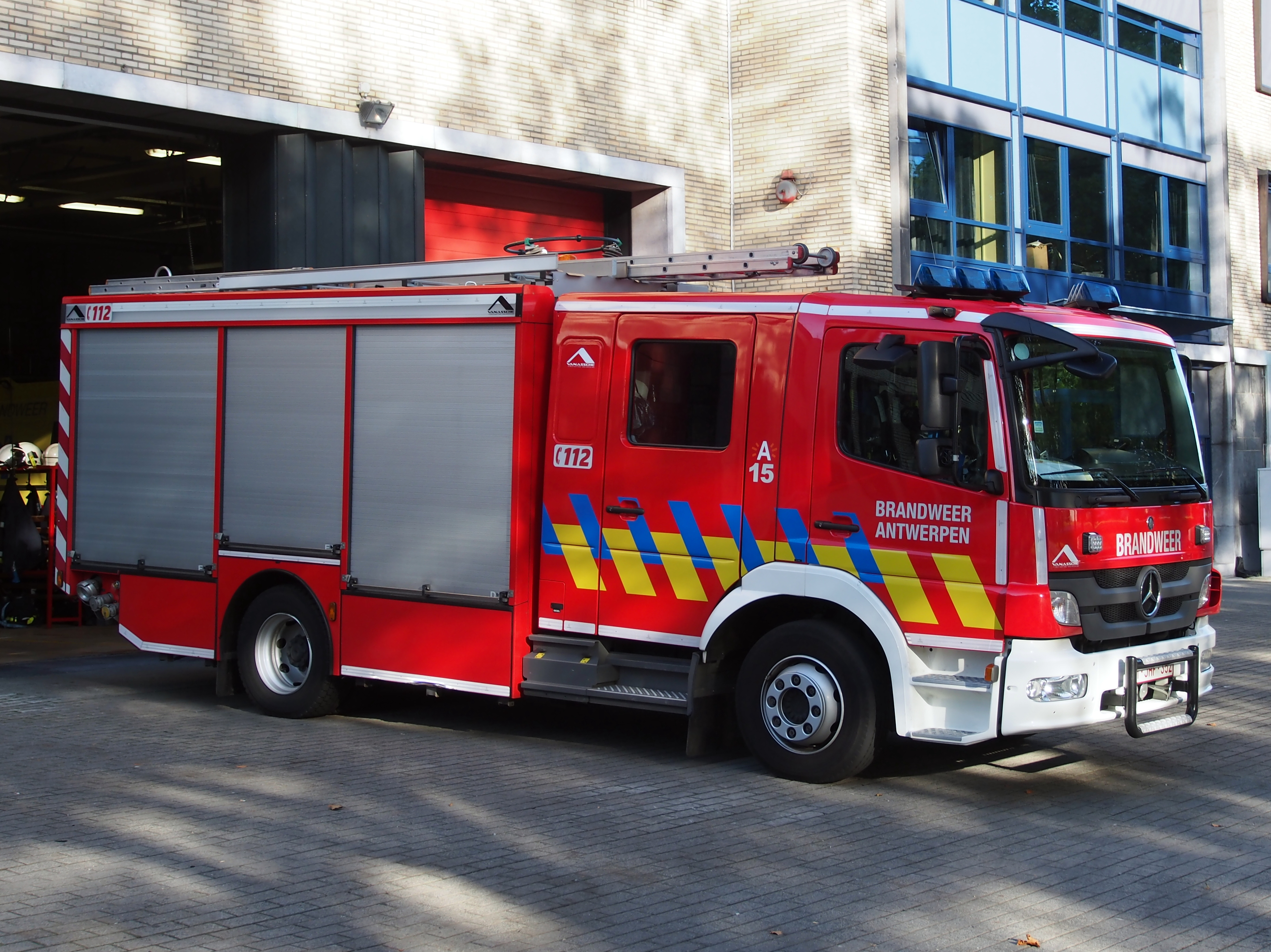
Fire engine of the Antwerp Fire Zone (2015).

=== Legal duties ===
By law, the fire zones and the Brussels Fire and Emergency Medical Service are responsible for: fighting fires and explosions, the rescue and protection of endangered people and property and logistical support, and this throughout five different phases of emergency management: pro-action, prevention, preparation, execution and evaluation. Additionally, the fire zones are also tasked with combating pollution and releases of hazardous materials, and with conducting fire safety inspections and promoting fire prevention among the general public. While also mentioned as one of their duties, the provision of emergency medical services falls under a specific framework and is further discussed below.

=== Emergency response ===
In Belgium, emergency assistance from the medical or fire services can be obtained via the European emergency telephone number 112 or the legacy national emergency telephone number 100. Calls to these emergency numbers are answered in one of the 112 emergency centres (PSAPs) managed by the Belgian federal government. Bar one exception, there is a 112 emergency centre in each of the Belgian provinces. Aside from the emergency numbers, there is also the telephone number 1722. This number is intended for reporting less emergent problems during storm weather, such as minor flooding or broken branches obstructing public roads. The 1722 number was created in 2017 to keep the 112 (or 100) number free for life-threatening emergencies during a surge of calls caused by a storm.

Information from an emergency call destined for the fire services is immediately forwarded by the 112 emergency centres to the appropriate fire zone or fire station. The fire zones or stations themselves are then in charge of dispatching the appropriate resources to the scene of the emergency. An important aspect of this arrangement is the principle of 'fastest adequate assistance' (Dutch: SAH, snelste adequate hulp, French: AA+R, aide adéquate la plus rapide, German: SAH, schnellstmöglichen angemessenen Hilfe) as laid down by the 2007 civil security law. This means that for a legally determined list of emergencies, the 112 emergency centre will alert the fire zone or station nearest to the emergency, even if the emergency falls beyond the jurisdiction of that zone or station. That zone or station which receives the alert is then required to respond outside of their territory.

=== Statistics ===
According to official statistics collected by Belgium's federal government, the fire zones and the Brussels Fire and Emergency Medical Service together carried out a total of 251,551 (non-EMS) interventions in 2020. Of these interventions, an absolute majority of 157,926 (62.78%) fell in the category "rescue and technical interventions". Interventions in the category "fire" amounted to 35,208, corresponding to 14.00% of the total number. Of these "fire" interventions, 11,826 concerned residential structure fires. The average response time for a fire in 2020, measured as the time between the fire zone or fire station receiving the alert and the first unit arriving on scene, was 11 minutes and 21 seconds. During all (non-EMS) interventions in 2020, firefighters were faced with 13,088 victims, including 11,812 injured civilians, 1,182 deceased civilians, and 94 injured firefighters in their own ranks. On average, 5.30 firefighters responded to a mission, varying from an average of 9.14 firefighters responding to a fire, to an average of 3.16 firefighters responding to "rescue and technical intervention" missions.

Caution should however be used when interpreting these statistics, as the data provided by the fire zones is not entirely complete.

=== Emergency medical services ===
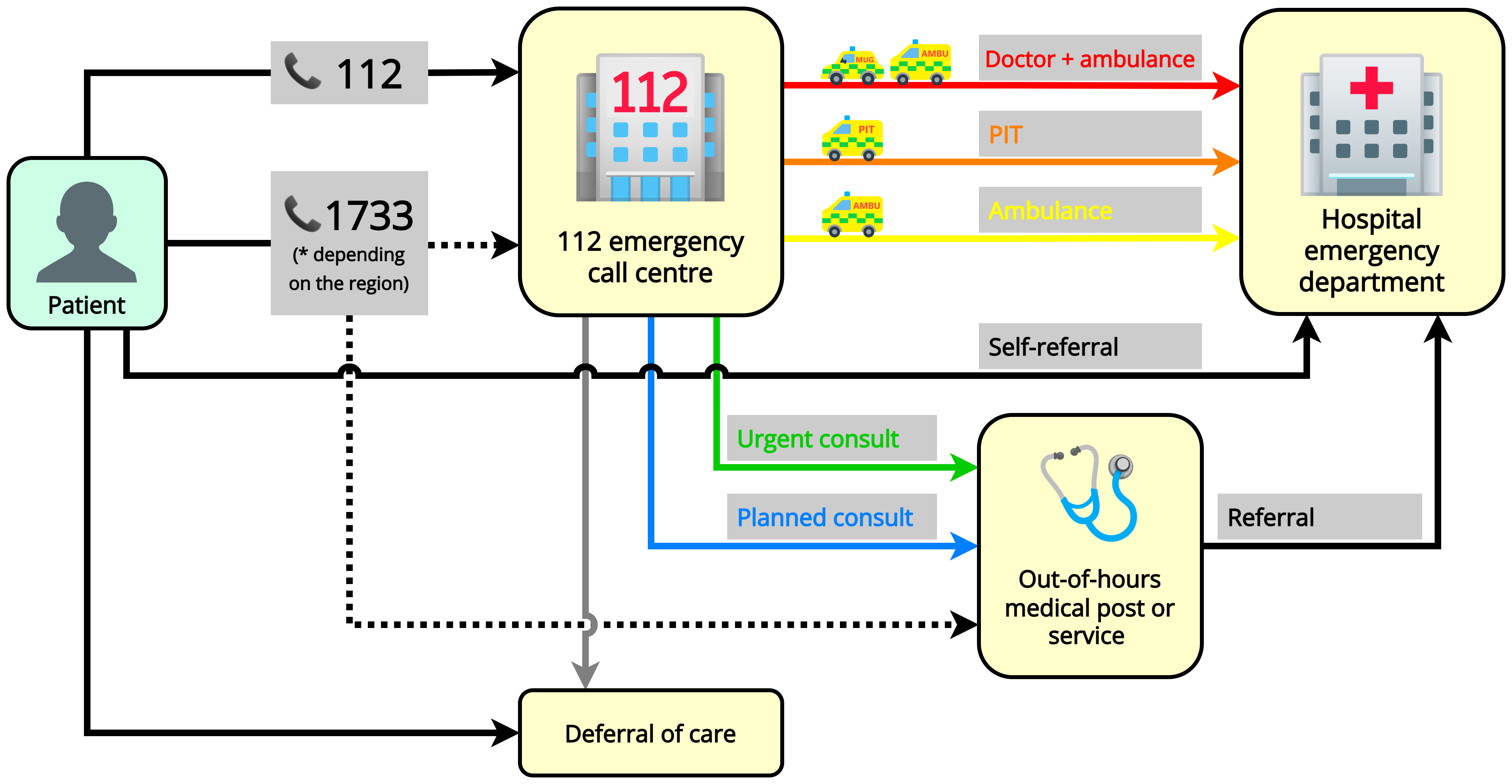
Schematic of the Belgian system for unplanned care (EMS as well as urgent primary care) as of 2022.

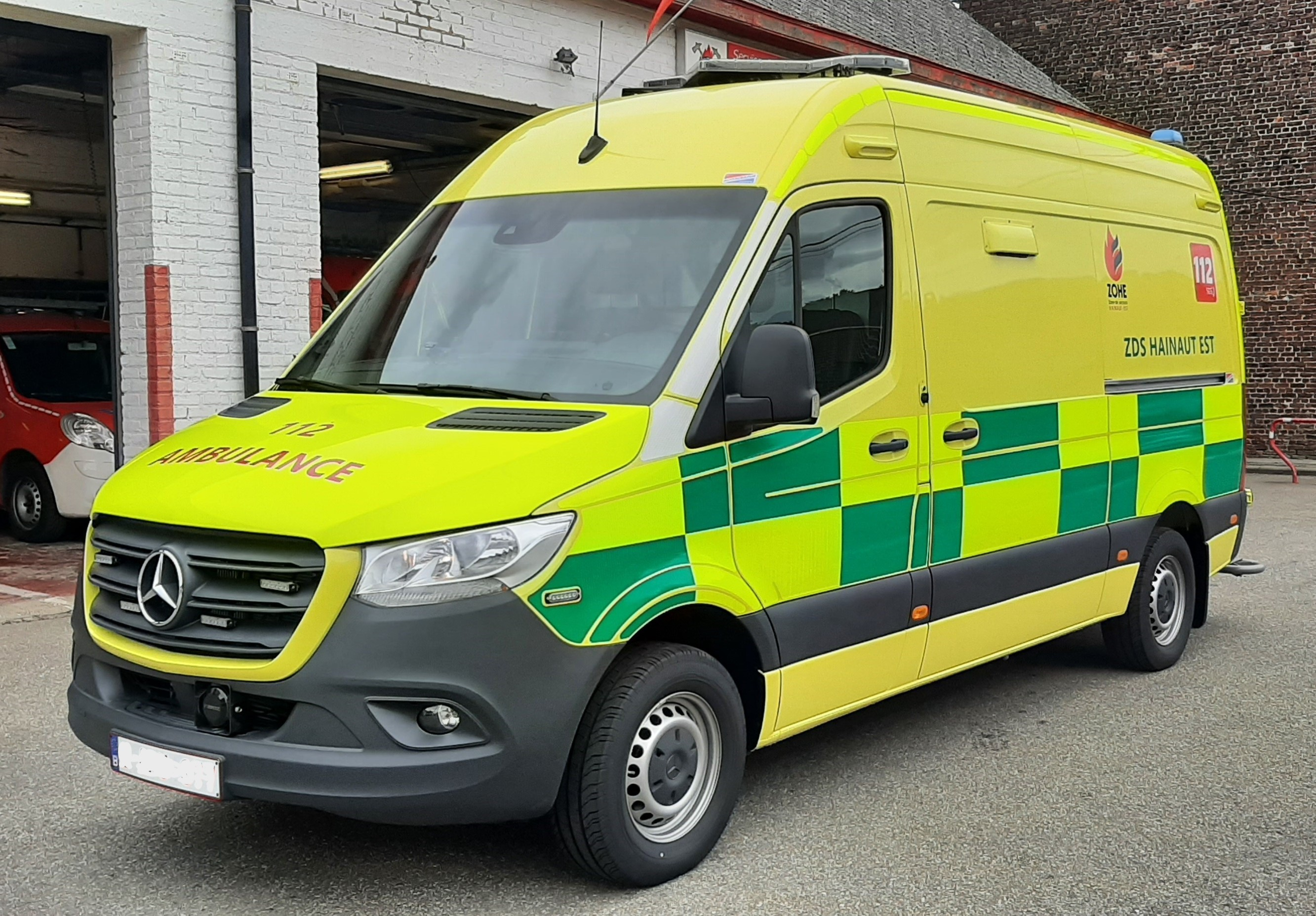
Emergency ambulance of the Zone de Secours Hainaut-Est.

Fire zones are not required to take up a role with regards to emergency medical services (EMS), although most of them do have an important stake in its provision. Emergency medical services in Belgium are principally organised along a three-tiered structure: firstly standard emergency ambulances which provide BLS-level care and transport patients; secondly so-called 'mobile emergency and resuscitation services' (Dutch: MUG, mobiele urgentiegroep; French: SMUR, service mobile d'urgence et de réanimation; German: MRD, mobiler Rettungsdienst) which provide ALS-level care by physicians using nontransporting vehicles; and thirdly so-called 'paramedical intervention teams' or 'PITs' which provide a level of care in between standard ambulances and the mobile emergency and resuscitation services, and consist of ambulances staffed with at least one emergency nurse. While all mobile emergency and resuscitation services and mainly all PITs are based at a hospital, emergency ambulances can be provided by any organisation concluding a contract with Belgium's FPS Health, Food Chain Safety and Environment. These ambulances can thus be operated by for example fire services, hospitals, the Red Cross or private companies. In practice, the absolute majority of all emergency ambulances are operated by the fire zones.

Emergency ambulances must be staffed by at least two emergency medical technicians (EMTs), in Belgium officially called hulpverlener-ambulancier (Dutch), secouriste-ambulancier (French) or Sanitäter-Krankenwagenfahrer (German). Some fire zones operating emergency ambulances may require their firefighters to also become certified as EMT, or may employ non-firefighter EMTs or even nurses to staff their ambulances. To obtain certification as EMT as of 2023, a participant must succeed for a 160-hour course. To retain the certification, EMTs must attend continuing education and undergo a five-yearly assessment.

Some fire zones also ensure the availability of PITs in partnership with a hospital. In this setup, the fire zone may provide the ambulance vehicle and/or an EMT, while the hospital usually provides the emergency nurse required to staff the PIT.

=== Fire safety and prevention ===
In addition to firefighting, the fire zones and the Brussels Fire and Emergency Medical Service are also tasked with certain responsibilities with regards to fire safety and fire prevention. Specially trained personnel perform fire safety inspections or check building plans during the application processes to obtain construction permits, under the authority of the mayor of the municipality concerned. In doing this, they apply fire safety regulations issued by different governmental levels and entities. They also provide fire prevention advice to the general public.

== Civil Protection ==
In Belgium, the civil security is safeguarded by two branches: the fire zones (and the Brussels Fire and Emergency Medical Service) on one hand, and the Civil Protection on the other hand. The Civil Protection is an emergency service managed by Belgium's federal government. It provides specialized assistance to other emergency services (including the fire zones) and public authorities to manage disasters. After the creation of the fire zones, the duties of the Civil Protection were reviewed. It was decided that since the fire zones were to ensure the basic missions with regards to civil security, the Civil Protection would focus on more prolonged and specialised missions in four key areas: chemical, biological, radiological and nuclear risks (CBRN), search and rescue missions (SAR), heavy technical deployments (HTD) and incident & crisis management (ICM). To this end, the Civil Protection disposes of specialised units and vehicles, such as mobile laboratories, rigid inflatable boats, search and rescue dogs, power generators, heavy pumps, water cannons, communications vehicles, and drones, among others. In 2019, the resources of the Civil Protection were centralised in two operational units: one in Crisnée and one in Brasschaat.

== Firefighting personnel ==
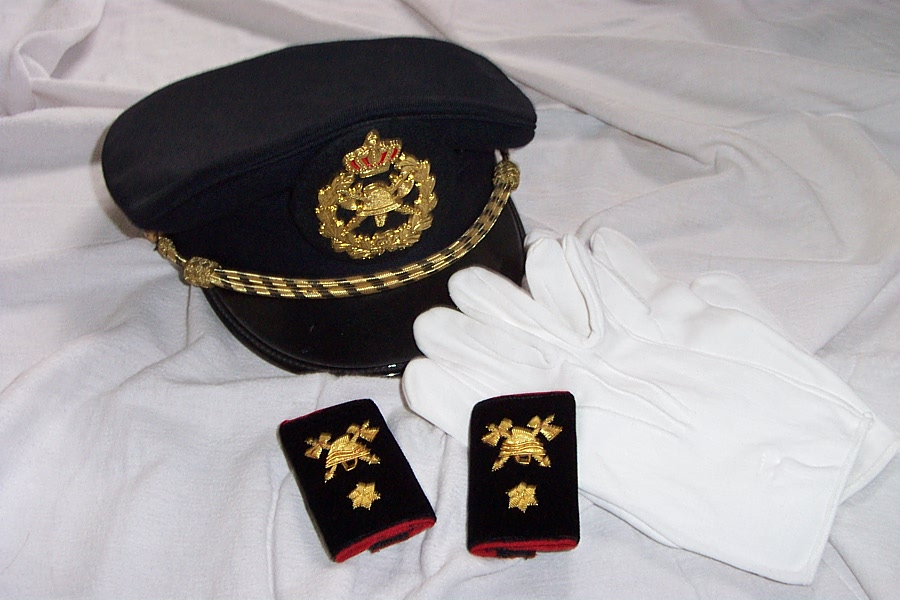
Parts of a firefighter's ceremonial dress: cap, white gloves and insignia.

The fire zones and the Brussels Fire and Emergency Medical Service rely on about 17,000 firefighters in total, consisting of around 6,000 career firefighters (35%) and 11,000 volunteers (65%), according to official 2018 figures. Of these firefighters, about 5% are members of the higher cadre, i.e. officers, and 16% are members of the middle cadre, i.e. NCOs. Are very small minority of about 2% of all firefighters are women. Aside from the firefighters, the fire zones also employ about 1,000 non-firefighter emergency medical technicians. Caution should however be used when considering the total number of firefighters, since a number of career firefighters are simultaneously active as volunteers in a different fire zone. The official number of 17,000 firefighters might thus be an overestimation.

Career firefighters can be found mostly in larger towns and cities, while rural areas rely mostly or entirely on volunteers. The Brussels Fire and Emergency Medical Service and the Antwerp Fire Zone, responsible for the port city of Antwerp, are the only ones employing exclusively career firefighters. When it comes to the number of personnel, the Brussels Fire and Emergency Medical Service is the largest in Belgium with almost 1,200 firefighters as of 2020.

=== Training ===
After the gas explosion of Ghislenghien in 2004, Belgian fire fighter academies have begun adapting newer techniques, such as the Swedish techniques for structural firefighting or USA's RIT-procedure (Rapid Intervention Team).

=== Ranks ===
The fire zones employ a rank structure for their personnel which mirrors the Belgian military ranks, and is laid down by a Royal Order.

==== Rank structure as of 2015 ====
	Officers (Higher cadre)				NCOs (Middle cadre)		Enlisted (Basic cadre)	
Insignia								
French	Colonel	Major	Capitaine	Lieutenant	Adjudant	Sergent	Caporal	Sapeur-pompier
Dutch	Kolonel	Majoor	Kapitein	Luitenant	Adjudant	Sergeant	Korporaal	Brandweerman

	Medical staff		
Insignia			
French	Médecin	Infirmier	Ambulancier
Dutch	Arts	Verpleegkundige	Paramedicus

==== Obsolete ranks ====
	Officers (Higher cadre)			NCOs (Middle cadre)		
Insignia						
French	Lieutenant-colonel	Capitaine-commandant	Sous-lieutenant	Adjudant-chef	Sergent-major	Premier Sergent
Dutch	Luitenant-Kolonel	Kapitein-Commandant	Onder-luitenant	Opperadjudant	Sergeant-majoor	Eerste sergeant

=== Officer promotion controversy ===
When the Belgian civil security reform came into force in 2014, all firefighter officers were automatically promoted to a higher rank, whether they held the appropriate certificate or not. This led to numerous disputes and was the subject of one of the demands announced during the demonstrations by Belgian firefighters before and after the reform, non-commissioned officers and men in the ranks feeling aggrieved, because no similar measure was planned for them.
