= 2015 East Village gas explosion =

Explosion caused by illegal tapping of a gas main

Coordinates: 40°43′42″N 73°59′18″W

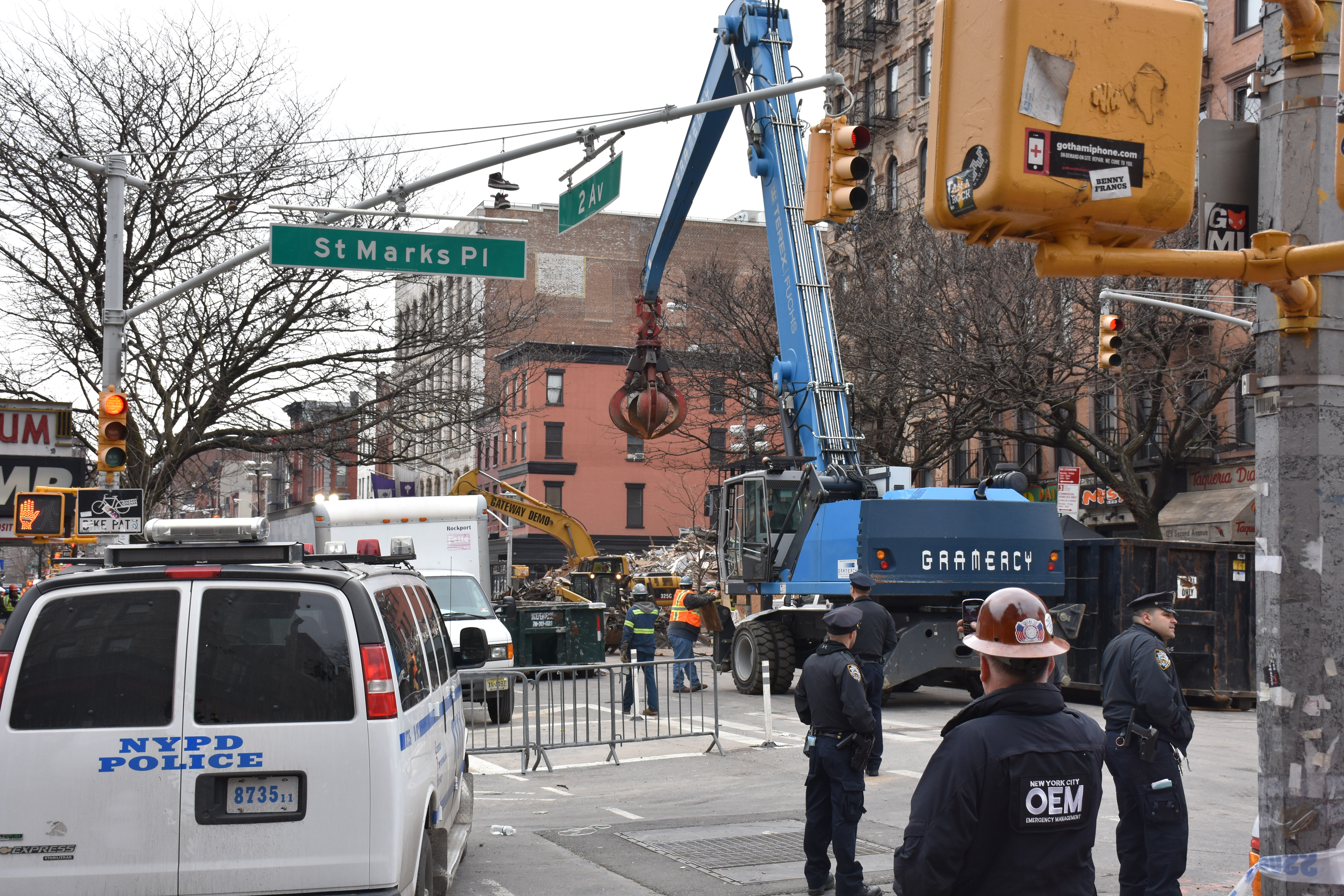
- Cleanup two days after the explosion
- Date: March 26, 2015; 11 years ago
- Location: 121 Second Avenue, East Village, Manhattan, New York City
- Cause: Gas leak
- Deaths: 2
- Injuries: 19
- Property damage: Buildings located at 119, 121, and 123 Second Avenue collapsed, 125 Second Avenue Damaged.

A gas explosion occurred in the afternoon of March 26, 2015 in a building located at 121 Second Avenue in the East Village neighborhood of Manhattan, New York City, United States. The explosion was caused by an illegal tap into a gas main. The explosion caused two deaths and injured at least 19 people, four critically; the resulting fire completely destroyed three adjacent buildings at 119, 121 and 123 Second Avenue between East 7th Street and St. Mark's Place.

== Background ==
In August 2014, a meter reader for Consolidated Edison, a utility company that delivers natural gas, electricity and steam in the New York metropolitan area, discovered that someone had illegally tapped into the 1 1/2-inch (3.8 cm) gas line that serviced the Sushi Park Japanese restaurant at 121 Second Avenue, the only part of the building authorized to receive gas service from Con Edison. The illegal taps were serving some of the apartments in the building. Con Ed stopped the flow of gas to the building for 10 days until the taps were removed and the plumber who did the work certified to the city's building department that it had been completed. Neither the building department nor Con Edison was required by law to verify that the work had been completed.

In the days before the explosion, workers had been installing a new four-inch (10 cm) gas line to service the apartments at 121 Second Avenue. Con Edison workers inspected the installation just an hour before the explosion, but did not pass it, for reasons not related to safety. The new line was locked off and not operational.

The row of buildings along Second Avenue between East 7th and 8th Streets had landmark status as part of the East Village/Lower East Side Historic District, created by the New York City Landmarks Preservation Commission in 2012. The date for the original construction of the Queen Anne-style building at #121 is not known, but it was altered around 1886; the Greek Revival building at #123 was constructed around 1834 and altered to the Neo-Grec style in 1913 by George F. Pelham; and the building at #125, which was designed by Pelham in the Renaissance Revival style, was built in 1901. All three buildings were five-story tenements; #121 and 123 were old-law buildings and #125 was a new-law tenement.

== Explosion ==
On the day of the explosion, Con Edison investigators had inspected a new gas-pipe installation at 121 2nd Avenue, which remained turned off, and left about 2:45 p.m. Shortly thereafter, the owner of the restaurant smelled gas and called the landlord of the building, but neither reported it to Con Edison nor called 9-1-1.

When the contractor in charge of the work and the landlord's son opened the basement door, an explosion occurred, and the front of the restaurant was propelled across the street. The first emergency calls were received at about 3:17 p.m. New York City mayor Bill de Blasio said, "The initial impact appears to have been caused by plumbing and gas work that was occurring inside 121 Second Avenue." Eleven other buildings were evacuated as a result of the explosion, and Con Edison turned off the gas to the area. Several days later, some residents were allowed to return to some of the vacated buildings. City officials, including de Blasio, said that they had suspected that leaking natural gas was the cause.

The explosion sparked a seven-alarm fire with 250 firefighters involved; four firefighters were treated for injuries.

=== Cause ===
According to law-enforcement sources, the likely cause is that one or more gas lines were surreptitiously tapped over several months using a device that was attached to the gas line with hoses siphoning gas to other lines. The siphoning apparatus was dismantled or hidden on Thursday before Con Edison conducted an inspection. As soon as the utility inspectors left, an attempt to resume the diversion of gas went awry, causing the gas leak that triggered the explosion.

== Impact ==
The three adjacent buildings at 119, 121, and 123 Second Avenue, on the northwest corner of East Seventh Street and Second Avenue, were completely reduced to rubble by the early morning of March 27, 2015. An adjacent building, 125 2nd Avenue, was severely damaged but remained erect.

Residents of 144 apartments in 11 buildings were evacuated. Multiple residents and families in the impacted area lost their homes.

Four restaurants were completely destroyed, all located on the first floors in the collapsed buildings: the East Noodle ramen shop at 119 Second Avenue; Sushi Park, a Japanese restaurant at 121 Second Avenue; and two restaurants at 123 Second Avenue: Pommes Frites—a Belgian fries shop—and Sam's Deli. An adjacent storefront at 125 Second Avenue was badly damaged. B&H Dairy at 127 Second Avenue was not damaged but was closed. A month later, many businesses in the neighborhood were still recovering economically from the explosion, although some had remained closed more than a week after the explosion and six were destroyed. The Good Old Lower East Side, a nonprofit social organization in the neighborhood, organized fundraising and donation drives to help people affected by the explosion.

Two men in the Sushi Park restaurant were killed: Moises Ismael Locón Yac, a 27-year-old employee, and Nicholas Figueroa, a 23-year-old customer on a date at the restaurant. They were initially reported missing and their bodies were found three days later on March 29 in the debris.

== Investigation ==
The FDNY's fire marshals, the NYPD's Arson and Explosive Unit, the New York City Department of Investigation and the Manhattan District Attorney's office conducted investigations into the incident.

Officials focused on plumbing and gas-line work in the 121 2nd Avenue building to determine whether a gas line intended only for the restaurant on the first floor was inappropriately tapped. No work permits were issued after November 2014 according to the New York City Department of Buildings.

Two roommates who subletted an apartment at 129 2nd Avenue—three buildings away from one of the collapsed structures—reportedly planned to sue the city for $20 million each.

== Indictments and arrests ==
On February 11, 2016, Cyrus Vance, Jr., the New York County district attorney, announced the indictment and arrest of five people in connection with the explosion, including building owner Maria Hrynenko, Hrynenko's son Michael, a plumber who had used his city license to allow others to perform work for him, the unlicensed plumber who did the work and a contractor, Dilber Kukic. The charges included manslaughter and negligent homicide. The indictments alleged that the explosion was the result of an illegal scheme to tap a legal gas line serving the ground-floor restaurant to provide gas service to the renovated apartments on the floors above. An attorney for the building owner had blamed Con Edison for the blast, saying that "they should have shut off the main valve."

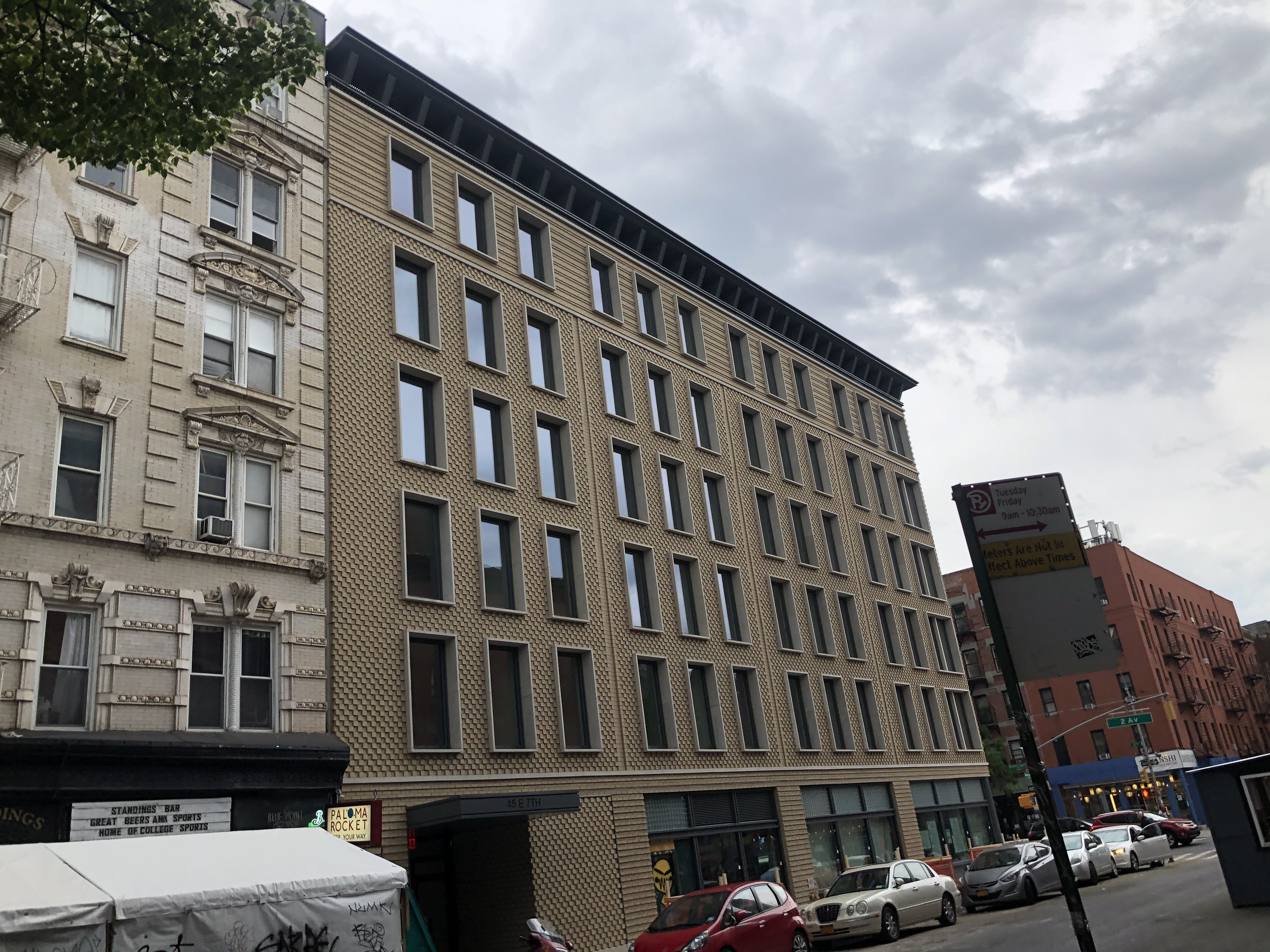
The new residential building in 2021

On November 14, 2019, Maria Hrynenko, Athanasios "Jerry" Ioannidis and Kukic were found guilty of manslaughter and other charges. Michael Hrynenko had also been charged, but died while awaiting trial. Andrew Trombettas, a plumber who sold his credentials to Ioannidis, pled guilty to lesser charges in January 2019.

== Site redevelopment ==
A building designed by Morris Adjmi Architects now occupies part of the explosion site. Out of the 3 buildings involved in the explosion, only 1 currently is being re-used.

== See also ==
- 2014 East Harlem gas explosion
