= 2001 Hutchinson gas explosions =

2001 gas explosion in Hutchinson, Kansas

- Date: January 17–18, 2001
- Location: Hutchinson, Kansas, US
- Cause: Natural gas leak
- Deaths: 2

On January 17, 2001, natural gas stored underground at the Yaggy storage field nearby Hutchinson, Kansas, leaked into empty brine caverns and salt wells, resulting in two gas explosions in the city of Hutchinson on January 17 and 18.

== Background ==
The city of Hutchinson, Kansas has had a prominent salt mining industry since the 19th century, when salt was discovered in Reno County in 1887. The primary method to extract salt at the time was pumping water into brine wells, and then evaporating it, leading to the creation of various empty and abandoned brine caverns across the city.

The Yaggy storage field, located seven miles northwest of Hutchinson, was developed in the 1980s as an underground propane storage field, with wells drilled into lower parts of the Hutchinson Salt Member. The field was eventually purchased by the Kansas Gas Service (KGas), a subsidiary of Oneok, and repurposed into a natural gas storage field.

== Cause ==
On the morning of January 17, 2001, technicians at the Yaggy storage field noticed a drop in pressure in 16 underground jugs that had been filled with natural gas over the past series of days. KGas traced the drop in pressure to a leak in the S-1 jug since at least January 14. About 143 million cubic feet (4,000,000 m^{3}) of natural gas had leaked through layers of fractured dolomite into abandoned brine caverns and salt wells, routing them to the surface and into buildings in downtown Hutchinson.

== Timeline ==
The initial explosion occurred at 10:45 am at the Decor Shop, destroying the building, the neighboring Woody's Furniture Store, and damaging 26 others. The force of the explosion had blown out windows in nearby buildings, although only minor injuries occurred. A gas fire had ignited at the site of the explosion, of which all attempts to extinguish, including disabling the local gas lines, failed.

By the evening, several sinkholes and geysers of water and gas reaching up to 30 feet (9.1 m) formed across the eastern side of the city. A day later, on January 18, another explosion in a trailer at the Big Chief Mobile Home Park critically injured two, John and Mary Ann Hahn, both of whom who later died from their injuries.

== Response ==
Initial response to the explosions, according to Holloway, was unprepared, as firefighters were unaware of the cause of the first explosion and failed to extinguish the resulting fire, with officials initially attempting to turn off the local gas lines to the buildings. The Kansas National Guard was called in to help evacuate parts of the city because of the gas leaks. Evacuations included more than 200 families; 191 homes on the east side of Hutchinson, including the residents of the Big Chief Mobile Home Park, and 43 businesses. Employees were evacuated from Underground Vaults & Storage, a salt mine storage location which housed the original film negative of The Wizard of Oz and various documents.

The Kansas Gas Service mobilized more than 100 workers to check for leaks, and began drilling operations to vent the gas in the brine caverns. 57 venting wells were installed by KGas across the city. Governor Bill Graves directed the Kansas Geological Survey to postpone out-of-state geological research for the US Army and to redirect their resources to assisting evaluations of the gas leaks and explosions.

== Aftermath ==
Several lawsuits were filed against KGas and its parent company, Oneok, one of which reached the Kansas Supreme Court after an appeal from the Reno County District Court, resulting in Oneok being found liable for the incidents but resulted in no damages awarded to the business class plaintiffs, one that resulted in $5 million in damages being awarded to residential class plaintiffs, and another that resulted in an award of $5.25 million to the plaintiffs, an increase from the initial $1.71 million.

An unrelated underground gas leak resulted in the explosion of an auto parts store in Hutchinson on February 22, 2025.

== See also ==
- List of gas explosions
