= 2014 East Harlem gas explosion =

Explosion caused by gas leak

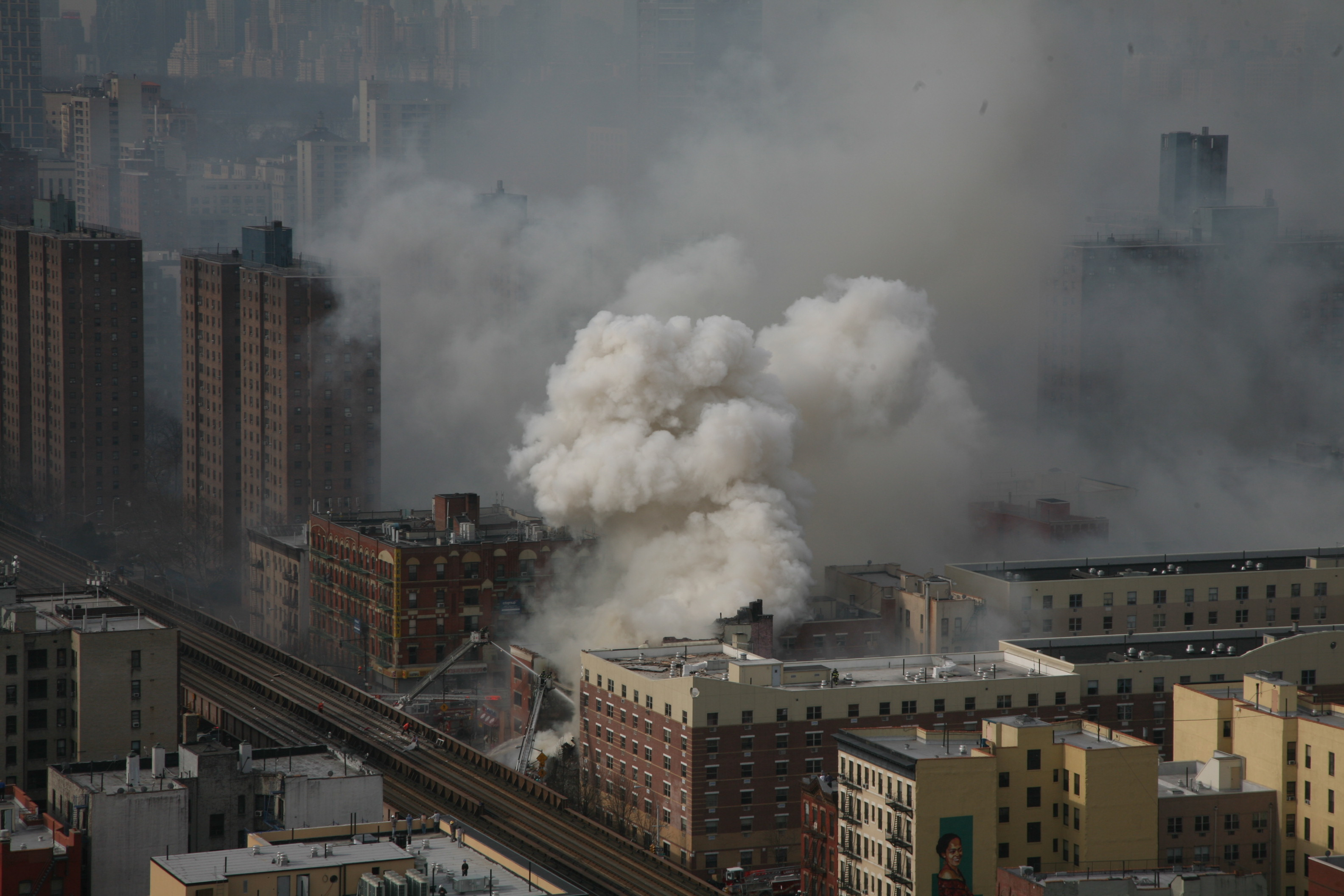
- Date: March 12, 2014; 12 years ago
- Time: 9:31 a.m.
- Location: 116th Street and Park Avenue, East Harlem, Manhattan, New York City; 40°47′59″N 73°56′36″W
- Cause: Gas leak
- Deaths: 8
- Injuries: 70+
- Property damage: Collapse of buildings located at 1644 and 1646 Park Avenue

On March 12, 2014, an explosion occurred at 9:31 a.m. in the East Harlem neighborhood of Manhattan in New York City, United States. The explosion leveled two apartment buildings located just north of 116th Street at 1644 and 1646 Park Avenue, killing eight people, injuring at least 70 others, and displacing 100 families. City officials initially pointed to a gas leak as the cause of the blast. In June 2015, the National Transportation Safety Board (NTSB) blamed the explosion on failures by Consolidated Edison and the city. The NTSB also agreed to review Whistleblower Gas Explosion Audit Findings from the 2009 Floral Park Queens gas explosion as part of their East Harlem Gas Explosion Investigation. The NTSB were unable to resolve these hazards found with merit by the New York State Public Service Commission (NYSPSC) and they remain a Public Safety Hazard today.

== Background ==
The two collapsed buildings were five stories tall and had a height of approximately 55 ft (17 m). Together, the two buildings contained 15 residential apartment units. 1644 Park Avenue had the "Spanish Christian Church" on the ground floor, while 1646 Park Avenue had a piano store occupying that space.

Utility company Consolidated Edison said it received a gas leak call 15 minutes prior to the explosion and had sent its two crews to the spot; however, they arrived after the explosion.

The United States National Transportation Safety Board (NTSB) – which has responsibility at the federal government level for investigating accidents involving pipelines and the transportation of hazardous materials – said that natural gas was found in nearby soil in varying concentration. NTSB Board member Robert Sumwalt also revealed that the gas main buried under Park Avenue near the scene at 116th Street dated back 127 years, to 1887.

== Explosion ==
Bricks, wood, and other debris landed on the adjacent Park Avenue main line viaduct of the Metro-North Railroad, suspending service to and from Manhattan for most of the day while crews cleaned up the debris. Service was restored by the evening rush.

In on-the-fly television interviews, witnesses described feeling the force of the blast from blocks away, and entire buildings shaking as though it were an earthquake; windows were blown out in adjacent properties.

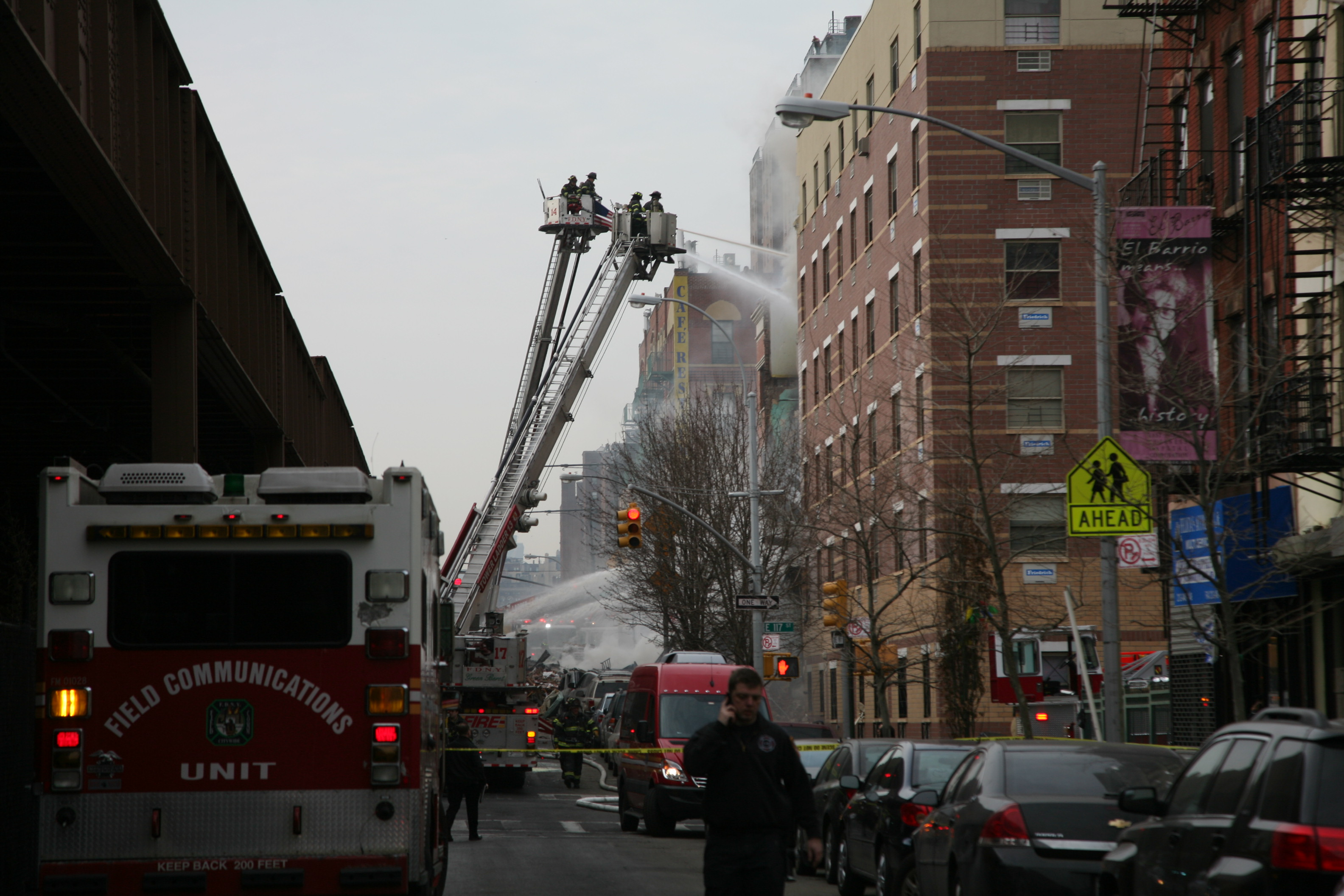
Firefighters battling the flames

Morning television shows on the major city networks were preempted in favor of nonstop news coverage of the explosion and its aftermath.

The New York City Fire Department (FDNY) and the New York City Police Department responded to the scene after the explosion within two minutes.

Two fire companies, quartered in an FDNY firehouse located approximately five blocks to the south, reported hearing and feeling the effects of the massive explosion and alerted the department's dispatch office. Within a short amount of time, the incident escalated to a five-alarm fire, bringing over 250 firefighters to the scene.

The American Red Cross in Greater New York was on the scene and helping those displaced, but otherwise not requiring emergency medical services, using nearby Public School 57 as a makeshift center before MTA buses transported them to a Salvation Army shelter at 125th Street.

=== Victims ===
Eight people were killed in the explosion and collapse.

- Carmen Tanco, 67, dental hygienist
- Griselde Camacho, 44, public safety officer at Hunter College Silberman School of Social Work
- Andreas Panagopoulos, 43, Greek musician
- Rosaura Barrios Vazquez, 43, and Rosaura Hernandez Barrios, 22, mother and daughter
- George Amadeo, 42
- Mayumi Nakamura, 34, Japanese artist

Two bodies were pulled from the wreckage that were not initially identified.

== Aftermath ==
The NTSB, which was responsible for investigating the gas-related incident, reported that faulty welding of two Con Edison gas pipes was primarily responsible for the explosion, but that it might not have happened at all if New York City had repaired a large hole in a nearby sewer main which it had known about for eight years. The hole in the sewer undermined the soil beneath the gas pipes, causing them to sag and then crack open. Thus it was the combination of the two circumstances which caused the disaster. The NTSB also faulted local residents who did not report the odor of leaking gas, which began at least a day before the explosion, and Con Edison's failure to notify the New York City Fire Department immediately once the leak had been reported to the company.

Con Edison sued New York City, and the office of Mayor Bill de Blasio rejected the NTSB's finding of fault on the city's part, saying that the effects of sewer leakage was "localized" and did not cause the gas pipes to break. The utility's suit, filed in June 2015, blamed the gas explosion on neglect by the city. Con Edison said the city was notified on multiple occasions about depressions on the street pavement.

In November 2015, an investigation by the New York Public Service Commission accused Con Edison of 11 violations of gas-safety regulations. The PSC found that the utility did not correctly install a gas pipe, and failed to notify the Fire Department after two reports of gas odors. The report said that undermining of a gas line by a neglected city sewer line was a contributing factor. In February 2017, Con Edison agreed to pay $153 million to settle the PSC charges. It was described by New York governor Andrew Cuomo as the largest payment for a gas safety incident in the state's history. The settlement will largely go to gas safety education, repairs of pipes prone to gas leaks, and costs incurred by residents and businesses as a result of the explosion. The utility did not admit wrongdoing.

== See also ==
- 2015 East Village gas explosion
