= Ghislenghien disaster =

2004 gas explosion in Belgium

Coordinates: 50.6685°N 3.8676°E

The Ghislenghien disaster was an explosion of a natural gas pipeline in Ghislenghien (a village in the municipality of Ath, Belgium) on 30 July 2004. It was caused by a natural gas leak resulting from damage caused by a construction vehicle. The explosion and fire killed 24 people (primarily first responders) and injured 132.

It was the worst industrial disaster in Belgium since the 1956 Marcinelle mining disaster and is one of the worst peacetime disasters in the country's history.

The disaster led to a reform of the civil security service in Belgium.

== Accident ==
Two gas pipelines link Norway to Paris through Zeebrugge, Belgium, and provide natural gas for France, Spain and Italy. Several weeks before the explosion, during construction of a factory in the Ghislenghien industrial zone, a piece of heavy equipment scratched a Fluxys high-pressure gas pipeline.

At 8:56 AM on 30 July 2004, while firefighters and Electrabel technicians were working to repair the leak, the pipeline exploded, following an increase of pressure in the pipe. A column of flames nearly 100 meters high raised into the sky. It was visible 15 kilometers away. A section of pipe measuring 11 meters and weighing multiple tons was sent flying 200 meters away. Due to the effects of the heat, electrical systems melted in nearby buildings hundreds of meters away. Heat was felt in a two-kilometer radius. Debris and building materials from the explosion were projected around a six kilometer radius.

An earthquake lasting over ten minutes was felt as far as Sirault, 20 kilometers away. The sound from the explosion was heard in numerous neighborhoods of south-eastern Brussels (Uccle, Linkebeek, Watermael).

The disaster killed 24 people (21 Belgian nationals and 3 French) and injured 132. Among the deceased were 5 members of the Fire Department of Ath (including the chief, Eddy Pettiaux) and police officer Pierre Dubois.

The five firefighters, the police officer and the Electrabel worker were given state funeral honors.

The last victim died in June 2005 due to complications from their burn injuries.

On 31 July, King Albert II returned from a state visit to Sweden to meet with victims' families. The day before, Prince Laurent and Prime Minister Guy Verhofstadt met with the families.

== Investigation ==
A trial, aimed at establishing responsibility for the disaster, ran from 15 June 2009, to 22 February 2010, at the Court in Tournai. Eleven of the fourteen defendants were acquitted, including the municipality of Ath, Fluxys, and Husqvarna, the sponsor of the factory construction project. The three people found guilty were charged with "involuntary homicide by lack of foresight or precaution". Those charged included the architect responsible for the project, Tramo, the company involved in the project, and the construction manager.

On 28 June 2011, at the Court of Appeal in Mons, Judge Jean-François Jonckheer, rendered a judgement on the case. Judge Jonckheer's judgement revises many of the lower court's rulings and challenges the case law on several points. The appeals court found Fluxys responsible for the disaster, as well as Diamant Boart (now Husqvarna Belgium). Additionally, the Tramo company was acquitted. Fluxys introduced an appeal in cassation.

== Aftermath ==
=== Reform of the Civil Security Service ===
Following the disaster, the government passed Law 15, which reformed the Belgian civil security services. By 2014, this led to the creation of emergency zones, which replaced regional fire services, which were previously under local control.

=== Regulations ===
In Belgium, the establishment of a cadastral survey of underground cables and pipes has been envisaged since 2007.

In France, regulations on the execution of construction projects DT-DICT was strengthened in 2012.

Additionally, a government order on 4 August 2006, imposed a revision of safety standards on gas pipelines, notably conducting hazard studies and reinforcing pipelines with HDPE plating to protect from possible construction damage.
