= 2023 Qaraqosh wedding fire =

Fire in Hamdaniya, Iraq

Qaraqosh wedding fire
- Still from a video showing the ceiling on fire

- Qaraqosh (Iraq)
- Date: 26 September 2023
- Time: 22:45 (AST)
- Venue: Al Haytham Wedding Hall, Qaraqosh, Al-Hamdaniya District, Nineveh Governorate, Iraq
- Location: 36°16′51″N 43°22′40″E
- Type: Fire
- Cause: Pyrotechnic flares
- Deaths: 107
- Injuries: 82

On 26 September 2023, at around 22:45 AST, a fire broke out at the Al Haytham Wedding Hall during an Assyrian wedding in Qaraqosh, Al-Hamdaniya District, Nineveh Governorate, Iraq. The fireworks accident was triggered by the ignition of the ceiling by pyrotechnic flares. Out of the estimated 1,000 people present, approximately 107 were killed, and 82 were injured.

== Background ==
The area where the fire occurred was captured by the Islamic State in 2014, and until it was liberated by US-backed Iraqi forces in 2016, there was heavy damage and massive relocation of its population. Iraq has a history of accidents which have been blamed on lax public safety regulations, such as a hospital fire in Baghdad in 2021 and the sinking of a ferry near Mosul in 2019.

== Fire ==
An estimated 1,000 people were believed to be present at the wedding. According to eyewitnesses, the fire started after flares were lit when the married couple began dancing together. The sparks from the flares ignited suspended decorations which fell and quickly spread to other flammable materials on tables. Video footage from inside the venue showed pyrotechnics shooting up from the floor and setting parts of the ceiling on fire while the bride and groom were slow-dancing.

The father of the groom indicated that there were no fire extinguishers or other safety measures in the hall. Management made the decision to cut the power, thinking the fire had been started by an electrical fault and immediately submerged the hall in darkness, making it harder for people to escape. The roof "caught fire within three seconds" and collapsed on the people inside. To help people evacuate the building quickly, a bulldozer destroyed parts of the wall.

== Casualties ==
According to Nineveh Deputy Governor Hasan al-Allaq shortly after the fire, 114 people died, with at least 150 injured. Of those killed, around 30 were identified by relatives, with the rest requiring DNA identification due to burns. On 1 October these numbers were lowered to 107 killed and 82 injured. A total of 27 children under 12 years of age were killed, the youngest being an 8-month-old.

The injured were transferred to nearby hospitals. An Iraqi journalist said that there was insufficient medical equipment to handle the casualties. Of those injured, a majority of them were completely burned while others were 50–60% burned. Contrary to initial reports, the bride and groom survived. At least 12 people who suffered severe burns were sent for treatment abroad.

== Investigation ==
Prime Minister Mohammed Shia' Al Sudani said that an investigative committee would be established and ordered all relevant authorities to intensify building inspections and verification of safety procedures. Interior Minister Abdul Amir al-Shammari stated that the results of the investigation should be released shortly after the fire.

Authorities attributed the spread of the fire to the wedding hall's exterior being covered with a highly flammable, low-cost type of "sandwich panel" cladding that was also blamed in the 2021 Baghdad hospital fire and was banned in the country. Sandwich panels were the primary cause of the fire spreading rapidly in the Grenfell Tower incident, which was often compared to the Qaraqosh fire by international media. The spread was exacerbated by flammable building materials and pre-fabricated panels which were in violation of safety regulations. Due to the combustion of the composite panels, which contained plastic, the fire spread very quickly and released toxic gases.

Over a year after the breakout of the fire, on 11 December 2024, the original owner of the wedding hall was sentenced to 10 years in prison by the Nineveh Criminal Court, with the court ruling that personal claims against the owner could be ruled in civil courts.

== Response ==
Security forces arrested ten staff, the owner, and three people responsible for the fireworks. Prime Minister Al Sudani announced three days of national mourning. On 28 September, he visited Qaraqosh to see the injured and the families of the victims. Members of the minority Assyrian community criticized government corruption and a lax approach to public safety, while religious leaders from the Iraqi Christian community called for an international investigation into the fire.

The Catholic archbishop of Erbil said that "words cannot describe the pain" that the community was going through, but added that the tragedy had brought together members of different religions in Iraq. "This tragedy has brought the people of Iraq together again. The Sunnis have cancelled their celebrations of the birth of their prophet Mohammad, and we have statements of condolences and support from the Shia community as well. The Governments of Iraq also announced three days of mourning", said Archbishop Bashar Warda.

== See also ==
Indoor pyrotechnics fires with at least 100 deaths

- 61st Regiment Farm fire in Xinjiang, China
- The Station nightclub fire in Rhode Island, US
- República Cromañón nightclub fire in Buenos Aires, Argentina
- Lame Horse nightclub fire in Perm, Russia
- Kiss nightclub fire in Santa Maria, Brazil

Other fires

- List of fireworks accidents and incidents
- 2009 Kuwait wedding fire
- Colectiv nightclub fire
