= Puttingal temple fire =

2016 explosion in Paravur, Kerala, India

- Puttingal Devi Temple in 2008

- Date: 10 April 2016
- Time: 03:30 IST (22:00 UTC on April 9)
- Location: Paravur, Kollam, Kerala, India; 8.8126°N 76.6644°E
- Cause: Fireworks accident
- Deaths: 111
- Injuries: 350+

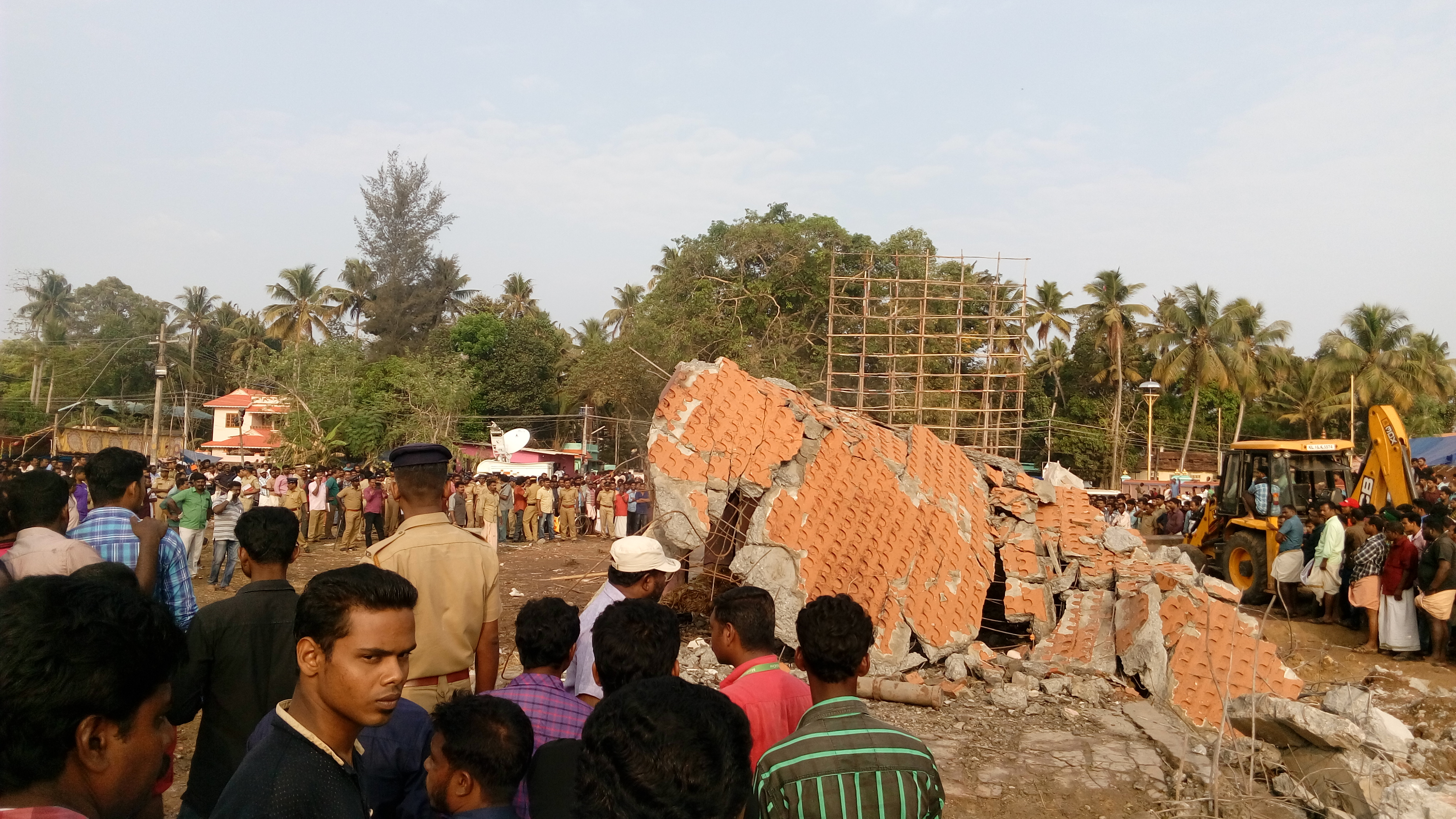
A collapsed concrete building in Paravur Puttingal Devi Temple premises after the fireworks mishap

On 10 April 2016 at approximately 03:30 am IST, (Note: 9 April, 22:00 UTC) the Puttingal Temple in Paravur, Kollam, Kerala, India, experienced a fireworks accident after firework celebrations went awry. As a result, 111 people were killed and more than 350 were injured, including some with severe burns. The temple and at least 150 houses in the area of the temple were damaged by the blast. According to local reports and eyewitnesses, the explosion and fire were caused by sparks from a firecracker being used in a competitive fireworks display igniting fireworks in a concrete storehouse. About 15,000 pilgrims were visiting the temple to mark local Hindu celebrations during the last day of a seven-day festival of the goddess Bhadrakali.

On 13 April, in the aftermath of the event, the Kerala High Court banned the display after sunset of sound-emitting firecrackers in all places of worship in the state.

This was the second major firework disaster reported in the news within southern India in recent years, after the Sivakasi factory explosion in the state of Tamil Nadu on 5 September 2012. The shrine is administered by a private trust.

== Background ==
Temples in southern India often have festivals with displays of fireworks and firecrackers to appease the female deity. Annual competitions are staged across the state of Kerala for the most spectacular displays. In 1952, 68 people were killed after a firecracker explosion at Sabarimala temple.

On 10 April 2016, two groups of devotees set off fireworks while thousands participated in the festival at Puttingal temple. The temple's authorities told police that they had verbal permission from the district authorities. On 12 April, they revealed that, due to safety concerns, the temple had been denied permission, but it proceeded due to pressure from the people.

== Fire ==
The fire took place at approximately 03:30 IST (22:00 UTC) when an explosion occurred in a stash of firecrackers stored in the temple for upcoming Vishu celebrations. The fireworks involved in this fireworks accident was known locally as Amittu, which fell into the stash after being lit during the firework celebrations. The explosion caused the storage building and adjacent office building to collapse leading to most of the casualties. The blast was felt by people living more than a kilometer away from the temple.

== Recovery ==
The Indian Navy dispatched one Dornier 228 transport aircraft and two helicopters for rescue transport along with medical teams from Headquarters Southern Naval Command (HQSNC), Indian naval air station located in Kochi. The Indian Air Force, Army and Coast Guard were also involved.

The majority of the victims were taken to Thiruvananthapuram Medical College.

== Investigation ==
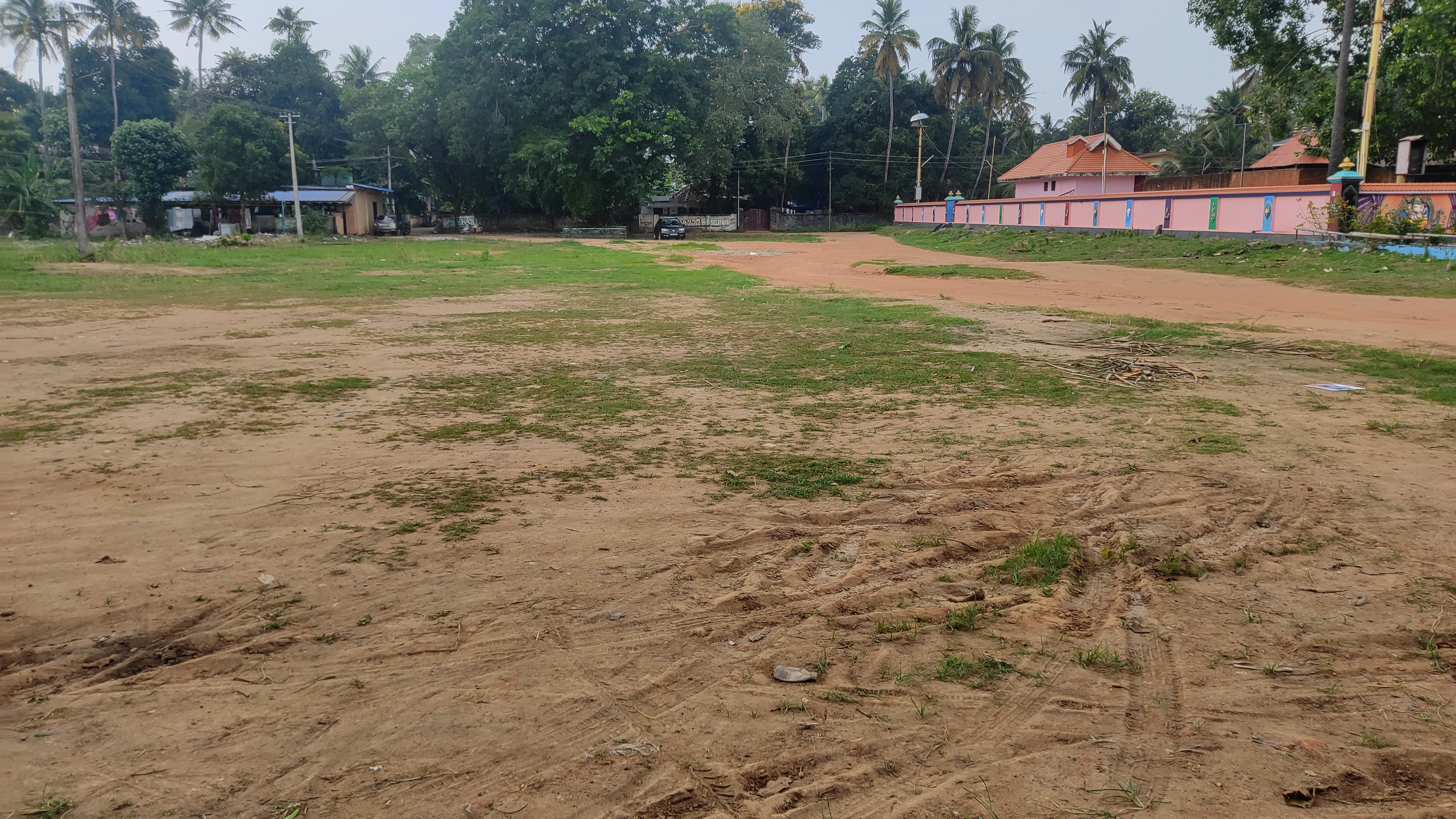
Location of the collapsed building in 2024

An investigation was ordered by Ramesh Chennithala, the Home Minister of Kerala. The police planned to take action against the display contractors and the temple administration. On 11 April 2016, five men who worked at the temple were taken into police custody for questioning. During the night of 11 April and into 12 April, the police arrested a further seven people connected with Puttingal temple, including the president.

The Inquiry Commission identified the causes of the incident as an unlicensed fireworks display, failure to maintain safety distances, use and storage of unauthorized fireworks, lack of crowd control, and the use of prohibited chemicals in firework manufacturing, as determined through public notices, site visits, and proceedings in Paravur and Kollam.

== Reactions ==
Prime Minister of India Narendra Modi wrote on Twitter that the incident was "heart-rending and shocking beyond words" and that he was on his way to visit the area later in the afternoon, as was Chief Minister of Kerala, Oommen Chandy. Kerala state home minister Ramesh Chennithala visited the disaster site. Political parties postponed campaigning for the election to the Kerala Legislative Assembly out of respect. Neighbouring Karnataka offered to send a team but was turned down as Kerala apparently had the requirements.

Modi announced ₹2 lakh (US$2,100) ex-gratia to the kin of the deceased and ₹50,000 (US$520) to critically injured people. Oommen Chandy announced ex-gratia relief of ₹10 lakh (US$10,000) to relatives of each of those killed in fire tragedy, ₹2 lakh (US$2,100) for seriously injured.

In the wake of the disaster, the Kerala Disaster Management Authority decided to re-examine the disaster preparedness of the Thrissur Pooram. The Chief Minister of Kerala, Oommen Chandy said that "Permission was never taken for the storage of fireworks inside the Temple."

== Movie ==
A Malayalam film named Kuttanpillayude Sivarathri was released in 2018 starring Suraj Venjaramoodu and was based on the incident.

== See also ==
- List of fireworks accidents and incidents
- 2011 Sabarimala stampede
- Anjootambalam Veerarkavu fire
- 2026 Mundathikode fireworks accident
