= Lame horse =

Lame horse may refer to:

- Lameness (equine), a wide variety of locomotion disorders in horses and other equines
- The 2009 Perm Lame Horse club fire
