= 2016 San Pablito Market fireworks explosion =

2016 Explosion at the San Pablito Market in Tultepec, Mexico

Coordinates: 19°40′6″N 99°7′37″W

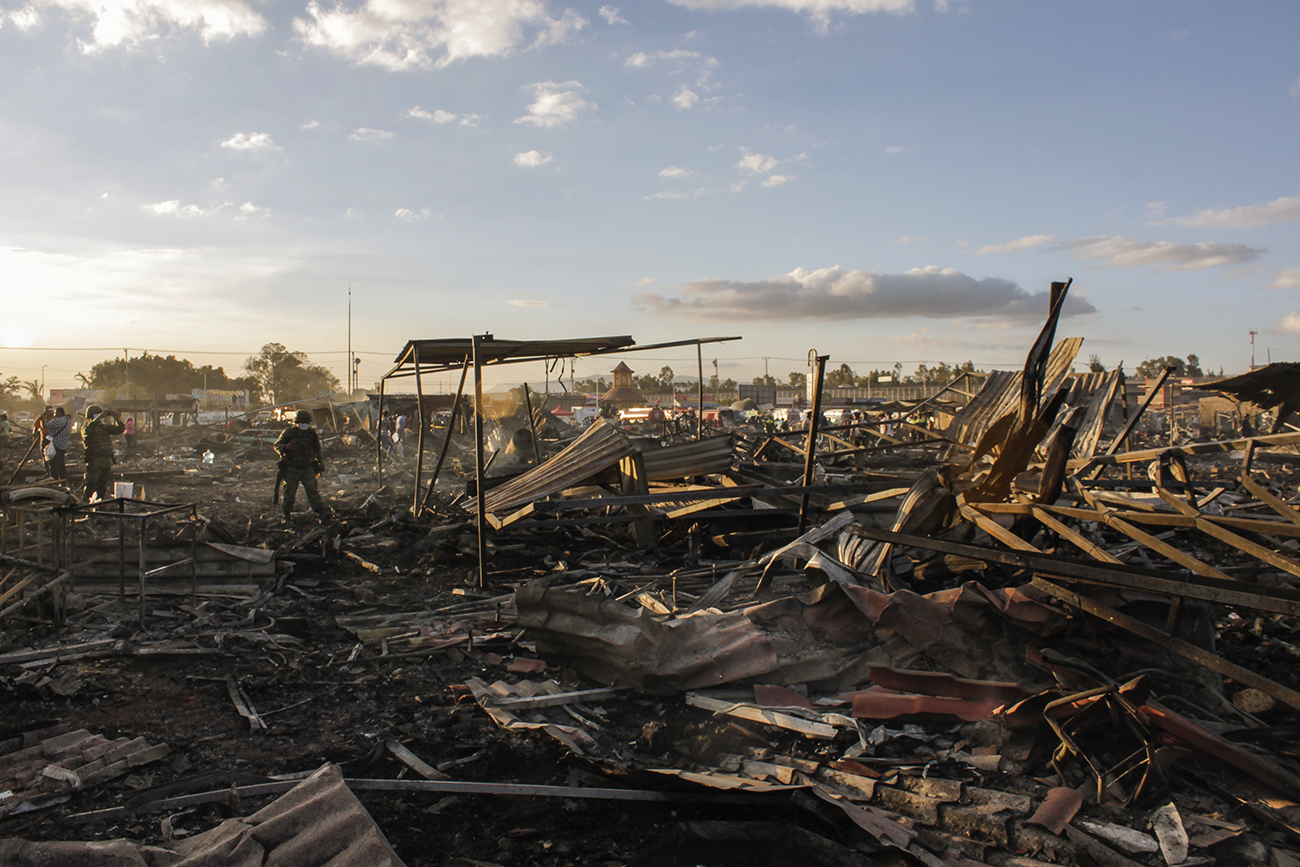
- Aftermath of the explosion
- Date: 20 December 2016
- Time: ~15:00 CST (21:00 UTC)
- Venue: San Pablito Market
- Location: Tultepec, State of Mexico, Mexico
- Type: Fireworks accident
- Cause: Likely gunpowder explosion
- Deaths: 42
- Injuries: 84
- Missing: 12

On 20 December 2016, a fireworks accident occurred at the San Pablito Market in the city of Tultepec, north of Valley of Mexico. At least 42 people were killed in the explosion, and dozens injured.

== Background ==
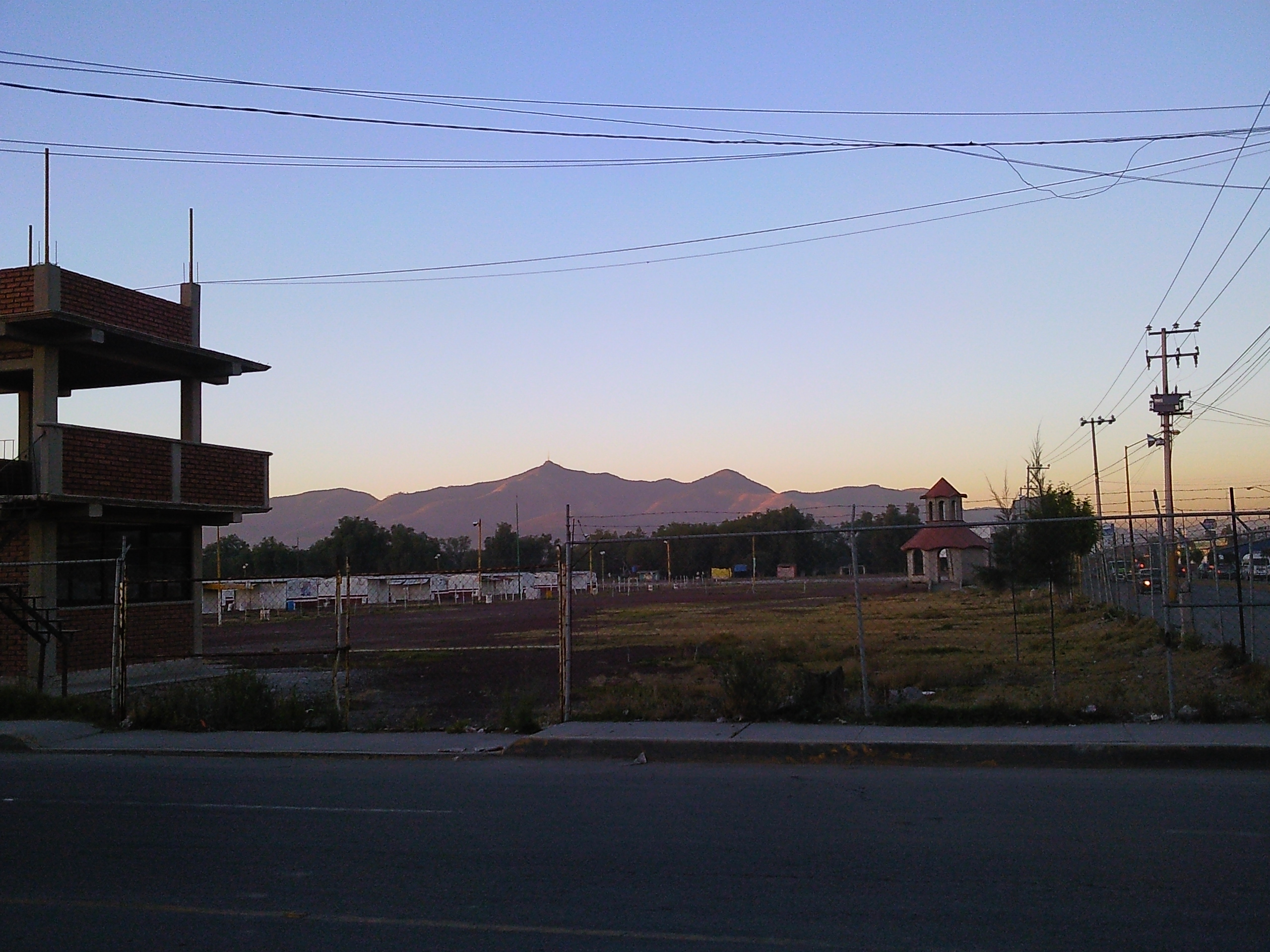
Partial view of San Pablito Market in 2010

Tultepec has a major fireworks culture and industry, with a two hundred-year history of fireworks production. About 65% of the population of the town is directly or indirectly involved in fireworks production. According to the Instituto Mexiquense de la Pirotecnia, 436 fireworks workshops or retailers were registered in the Tultepec municipality. San Pablito Market is a major center for Mexican handcrafted fireworks. The city had implemented new safety measures in the market following firework-related explosions in 2005 and 2006.

== Explosion ==
External videos
- Explosion at Mexico fireworks market, The Guardian.

The cause of the explosion is unknown, but sources preliminarily claimed that gunpowder from the fireworks ignited the explosion. Up to 300 tonnes of fireworks were reported to have been present at the market. The explosion occurred at approximately 15:00 CST (21:00 UTC). As of 24 December, at least 36 people died, with at least 84 more injured. Of the dead, 26 died at the site of the explosion and the remaining at the hospital. Of the injured, 46 individuals were hospitalized, five of whom were in critical condition.

Six children were among the injured, including a girl with burns to over 90% of her body. Once they were stable and guardians had been contacted, these children were planned to be transferred to Shriners Hospital for Children in Galveston, Texas, United States, to be treated. Nearby homes were damaged significantly and much of the market was leveled in the explosion.

== Reaction ==
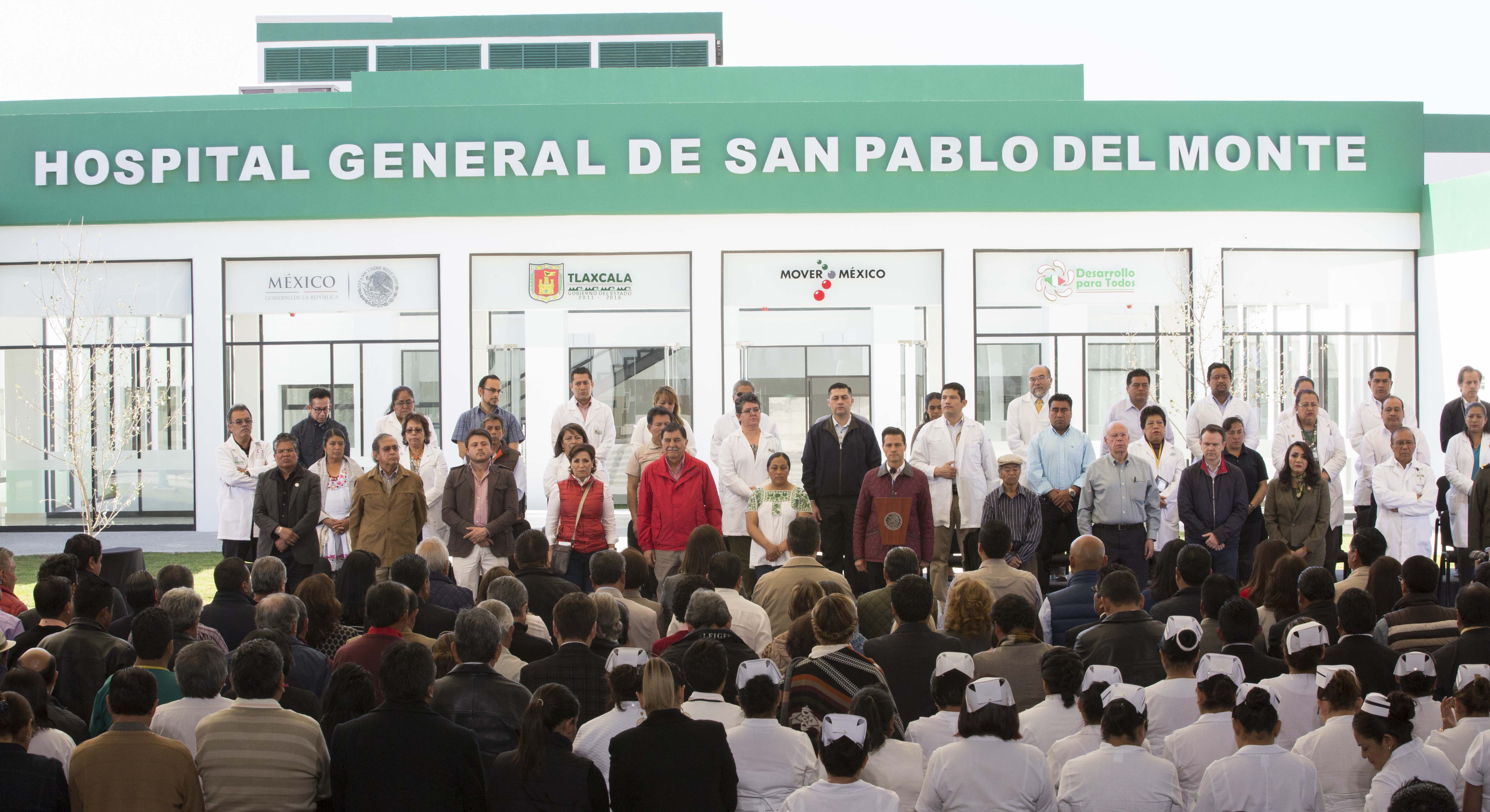
Enrique Peña Nieto, his cabinet, and multiple doctors and nurses observing a moment of silence during an event in San Pablo del Monte, Tlaxcala

José Manzur, representing the government of the State of Mexico, stated that all funeral and medical bills of those killed and injured will be paid for by the government. President Enrique Peña Nieto offered his condolences and ordered federal agencies to coordinate with state authorities to help the families of those affected, particularly in medical care. Germán Galicia Cortes, the president of San Pablito Market, said that vendors would receive government assistance to help cover their losses, and pledged to re-open the market. The office of the federal attorney general began an investigation into the incident, with forensic investigators deployed to the site on 21 December.

== Gallery ==
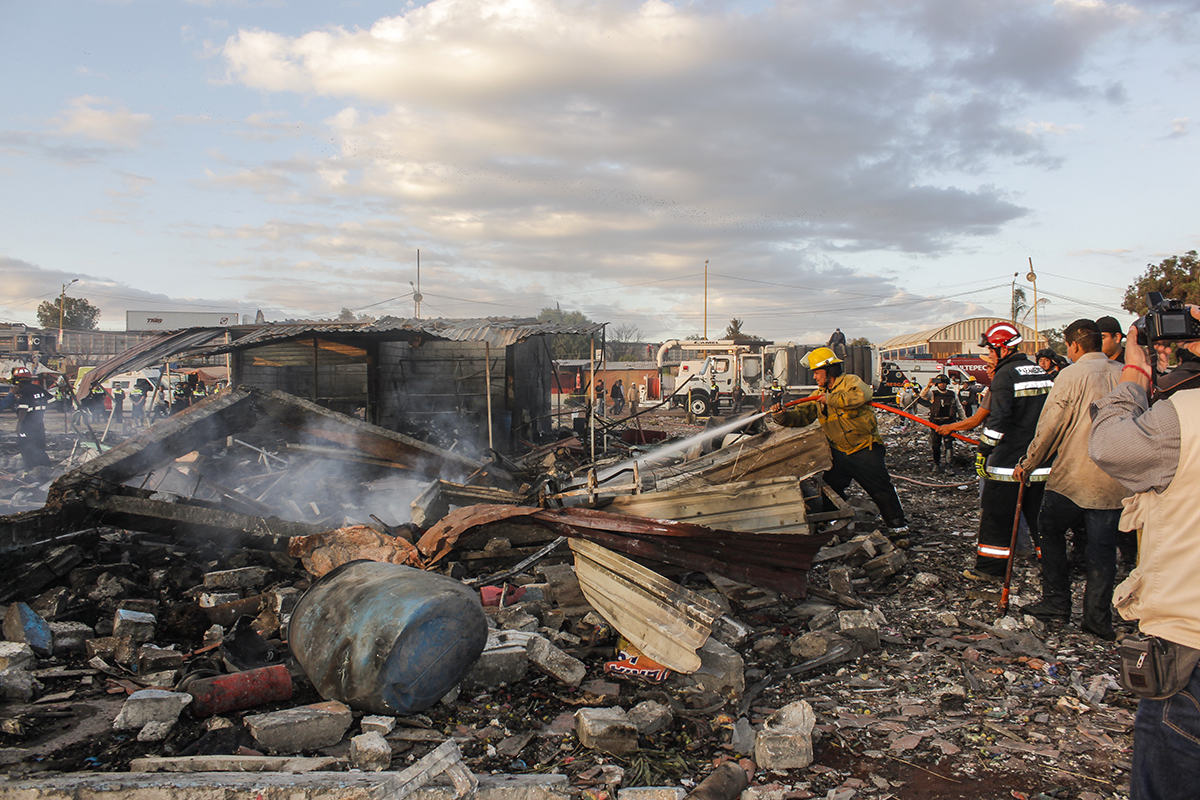
A firefighter extinguishing a fire

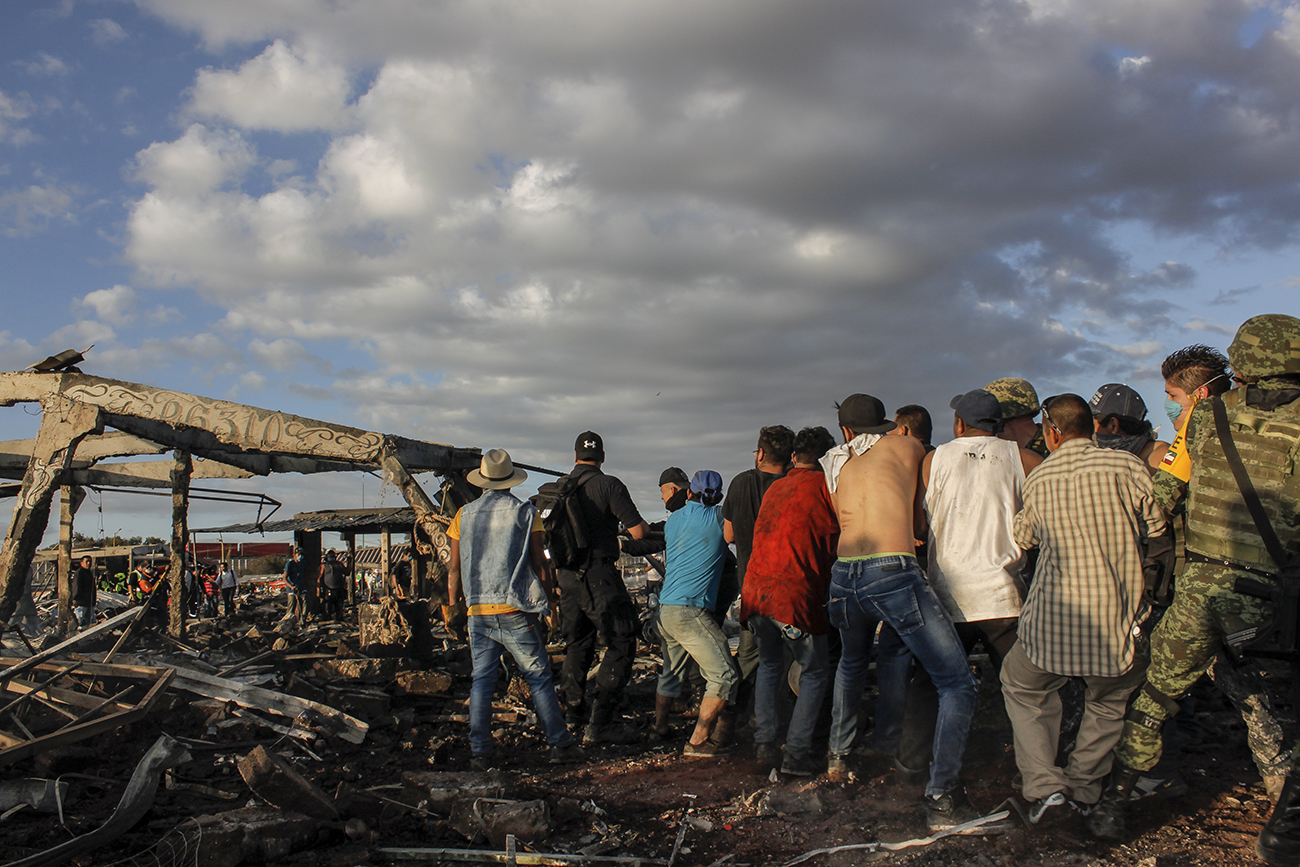
People searching through debris

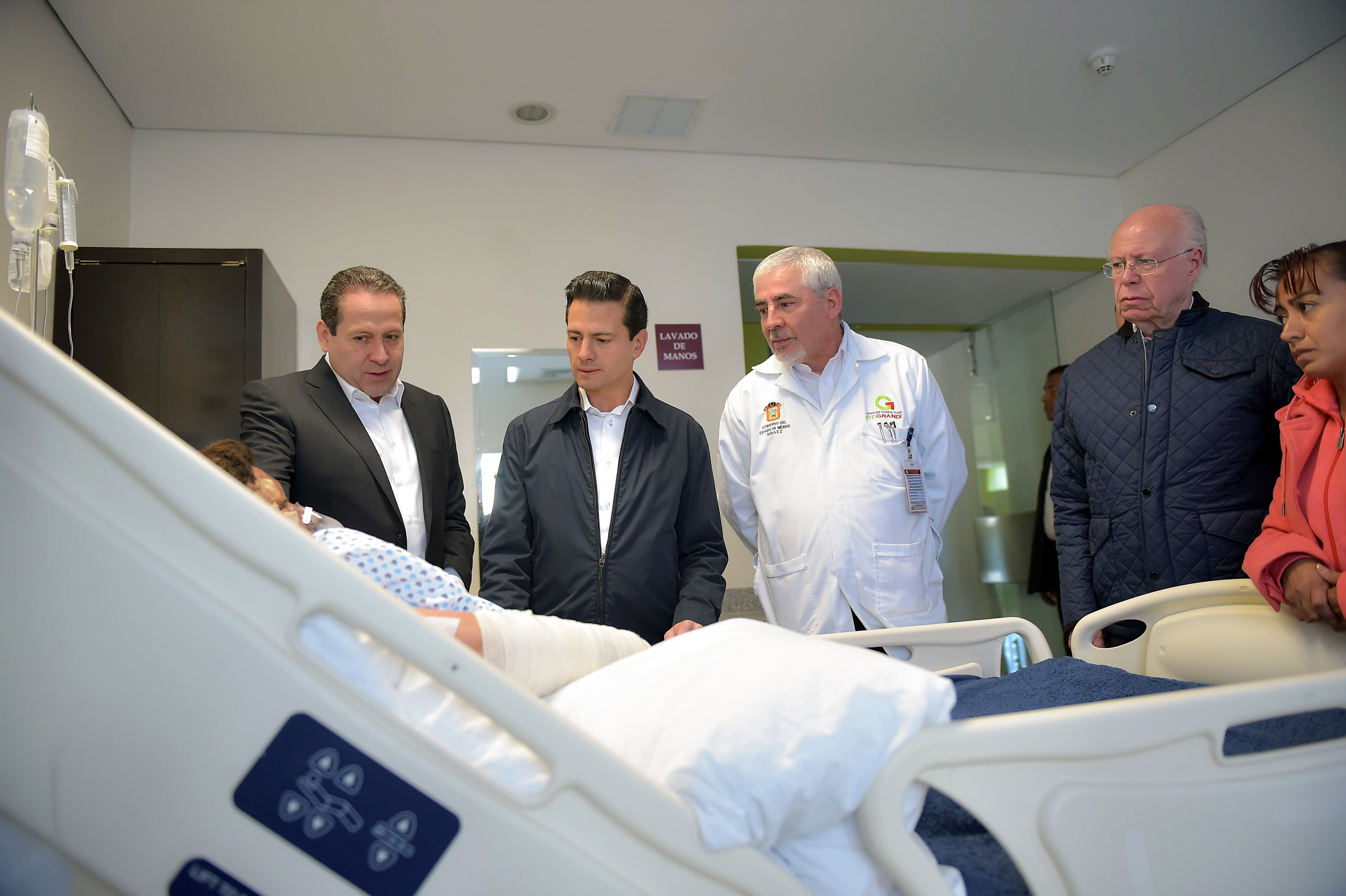
Eruviel Ávila Villegas (far left) and Enrique Peña Nieto visiting an injured person

== See also ==
- List of fireworks accidents and incidents
- Mexico City fireworks disaster, a 1988 fireworks disaster in Mexico City
