= List of fireworks accidents and incidents =

This is a list of fireworks accidents and incidents, including pyrotechnics fire and explosion. The list is sortable by casualties and date.

Date	Event	Location	Country	Casualties	Structure
5 May 1869	C. N. Romaine & Brothers fireworks factory explosion	Petersburg, Virginia	United States	12 deaths	Factory
4 November 1902	Fireworks explosion at Madison Square	New York City	United States	15 deaths	
21 June 1903	Fireworks explosion in downtown shop	Paterson, New Jersey	United States	17 deaths	Warehouse
3 July 1908	S. S. Kresge Fireworks Explosion	Cleveland, Ohio	United States	7 deaths	Five and dime store
3 July 1909	Nampa Fire of 1909	Arnold Cigar Store, Nampa, Idaho	United States	4–5 deaths, unconfirmed	Cigar store
6 March 1928	Fireworks factory explosion	Samarang, Java	Indonesia	20+ deaths	Factory
3 April 1930	Pennsylvania Fireworks Display Company factory explosion	Devon, Pennsylvania	United States	9 deaths	Factory
1 July 1937	Drake Drug Company fireworks explosion	Nampa, Idaho	United States	6 deaths	Drug Store
6 November 1942	Rochester Fireworks Company explosion	Perinton, New York	United States	11 deaths	Factory
1 April 1947	Fireworks factory explosion	Clinton, Missouri	United States	10 deaths	Factory
5 June 1953	Alco Fireworks Co. explosion	Houston, Texas	United States	4 deaths	Warehouse
23 June 1958	Fireworks stand explosion	Salvador, Bahia	Brazil	100+ deaths	
24 August 1964	Fireworks ignite storage tanks	Atlatlahucan	Mexico	45 deaths	
27 May 1970	Carpentersville Fireworks Company explosion	Huntley, Illinois	United States	3 injuries	Factory
17 May 1971	Continental Fireworks Company explosion	Pisgah, Illinois	United States	3 deaths, 5 injuries	Factory
13 June 1971	Fireworks explosion destroys school	Puebla	Mexico	13 deaths	
6 March 1972	Melrose Display Fireworks Company explosion	Orland Park, Illinois	United States	3 deaths, 16 injuries	Factory
4 July 1972	Bangs Lake Park explosion	Wauconda, Illinois	United States	1 death, 8 injuries	Park
30 May 1973	Children injured by discarded shell	Huntley, Illinois	United States	2 injuries	Factory
9 June 1973	Worldwide Fireworks Company explosion	McHenry, Illinois	United States	7 injuries	Factory
18 February 1977	Xinjiang 61st Regiment Farm fire	Xinjiang 61st Regiment	China	694 deaths, 161 disabled	Public hall
10 August 1982	Rockingham Fireworks Manufacturing and Display Co. Inc	Seabrook, New Hampshire	United States	4 dead, 3 injured	Factory
27 May 1983	Benton fireworks disaster	Benton, Tennessee	United States	11 deaths, 1 injury	Factory
7 September 1984	C23 tragedy	Qala, Gozo	Malta	7 deaths, 1 injury	Patrol Craft Fast
20 May 1985	Illegal fireworks factory explosion	Beaver Township, Mahoning County, Ohio	United States	9 deaths	Factory
25 June 1985	Aerlex Fireworks plant explosion	Hallett, Oklahoma	United States	21 deaths, 5 injuries	Factory
5 April 1986	1986 San Francisco fireworks disaster	San Francisco, California	United States	8–9 deaths, 20 injuries	Factory
4 July 1987	National Mall Fireworks Display	Washington DC	United States	4+ injuries	Park
25 September 1987	Celebrity Fireworks plant explosion	Rialto, California	United States	1 death	Factory
12 December 1988	Mexico City fireworks disaster	Mexico City	Mexico	62+ deaths, up to 83 injuries	Market
22 March 1989	Fengate fireworks factory explosion	Peterborough	United Kingdom	1 firefighter death, over 100 injuries	Factory
14 February 1991	Culemborg fireworks disaster	Culemborg and Vianen	Netherlands	2 deaths, dozens of injuries	Factory
7 March 1991	Bright Sparklers fireworks disaster	Sungai Buloh	Malaysia	26 deaths, 83 injuries	Factory
21 June 1991	Fireworks store explosion	Rio de Janeiro	Brazil	22 deaths	Warehouse
7 June 1994	Fireworks factory warehouse fire	Maricopa County, Arizona	United States	1 death	Factory
31 January 1996	1996 Shaoyang explosion	RFX factory in Shaoyang, Hunan	China	134 death, 405 injuries	RDX factory
3 July 1996	Fireworks stand explosion	Lawrence County, Ohio	United States	9 deaths, 11 injuries	Shop
1 November 1996	Accidents in a number of fireworks factories	Unknown	China	51 deaths	Factory
5 March 1997	Pyro Shows fireworks warehouse explosion	LaFollette, Tennessee	United States	4 deaths	Warehouse
3 July 1997	Riverfront Park fireworks display	Alton, Illinois	United States	3 deaths	Barge
11 December 1998	Independence Professional Fireworks factory explosion	Osseo, Michigan	United States	7 deaths	Factory
26 September 1999	Celaya fireworks disaster	Celaya	Mexico	63 deaths, 348 injuries	Warehouse
1 December 1999	Explosion in a fireworks factory	Unknown	Brazil	39 deaths	Factory
13 May 2000	Enschede fireworks disaster	Enschede	Netherlands	23 deaths, c. 950 injuries	Factory
1 January 2001	Volendam New Year's fire	Volendam	Netherlands	14 deaths, 241 injuries	Nightclub
24 November 2001	Canecão Mineiro nightclub fire	Belo Horizonte	Brazil	7 deaths, 197 injuries	Nightclub
29 December 2001	Mesa Redonda fire	Lima	Peru	291 deaths, 134 injuries	Shopping center
20 February 2003	The Station nightclub fire	West Warwick, Rhode Island	United States	100 deaths, 230 injuries	Nightclub
4 April 2004	Plymouth fireworks disaster	Plymouth, Pennsylvania	United States	1 injury	Factory
3 November 2004	Seest fireworks disaster	Seest	Denmark	1 death, 24 injuries	Factory
30 December 2004	Cromañón nightclub fire	Buenos Aires	Argentina	194 deaths, 1,492+ injuries	Nightclub
4 December 2006	Festival Fireworks Factory	East Sussex	United Kingdom	2 deaths, 12 injuries	Factory
31 December 2007	Fireworks explosion at Bulacan	Bocaue	Philippines	4 missing (later found back), 7 injuries	Shops
1 February 2008	Istanbul fireworks disaster	Istanbul	Turkey	22+ deaths, 100+ injuries	Factory
30 March 2008	WrestleMania XXIV	Orlando, Florida	United States	0 deaths, approx. 40 injuries	Football stadium
19 April 2008	Factory nightclub fire	Quito	Ecuador	15 deaths, 35 injuries	Nightclub
21 September 2008	Wuwang Club fire	Shenzhen	China	43 deaths, 88 injuries	Nightclub
1 January 2009	Santika Club fire	Bangkok	Thailand	67 deaths, 222 injuries	Nightclub
29 January 2009	Starmaker Fireworks Factory explosion	Trece Martires	Philippines	8+ deaths, 70+ injuries	Factory
9 February 2009	Beijing Television Cultural Center fire	Beijing	China	1 death, 7 injuries	Open-air fireworks show
5 December 2009	Lame Horse fire	Perm	Russia	156 deaths, 78 injuries	Nightclub
4 July 2012	Big Bay Boom premature mass discharge	San Diego, California	United States	0 casualties	Open-air fireworks show from four barges and a pier
5 September 2012	Sivakasi factory explosion	Sivakasi	India	40 deaths, 70+ injuries	Factory
27 January 2013	Kiss nightclub fire	Santa Maria, Rio Grande do Sul	Brazil	242 deaths, 630 injuries	Nightclub
20 June 2013	B.E.M. Fireworks explosion	Coteau-du-Lac, Quebec	Canada	2 deaths	Warehouse
20 April 2014	Fireworks incident	De Kuip, Rotterdam	Netherlands	0 deaths	Football stadium
30 October 2015	Colectiv nightclub fire	Bucharest	Romania	64 deaths, 146 injuries	Nightclub
31 December 2015	Manila New Year's fireworks	Manila	Philippines	1 death, 380 injuries, thousands displaced	Open-air fireworks show
10 April 2016	Puttingal temple fire	Kollam, Kerala	India	111 deaths, 350+ injuries	Place of worship
20 December 2016	2016 San Pablito Market fireworks explosion	Tultepec	Mexico	42 deaths, 84 injuries	Market
26 October 2017	Tangerang fireworks disaster	Tangerang	Indonesia	49 deaths, 46 injuries	Factory
6 June 2018	Fireworks explosion	Tultepec	Mexico	7 deaths, 7 injuries	Warehouse
5 July 2018	Fireworks disaster	Tultepec	Mexico	24 deaths, 49+ injuries	Warehouse
16 March 2021	Ontario fireworks explosion	Ontario, California	United States	2 deaths, 1 injured	Residential area
4 July 2021	LAPD firework disposal accident	Los Angeles, California	United States	17 injuries	Residential area
4 July 2021	Spring Hill firework accident injuring a bystander and her son	Spring Hill, Tennessee	United States	2 injuries	Residential area
4 July 2021	Death of Matīss Kivlenieks	Novi, Michigan	United States	1 death	Residential area
6 June 2022	Hale Artificier Inc. Fireworks Storage Accident	La Grange, North Carolina	United States	1 death, 3 injuries	Farm
14 July 2022	Bastille Day	Cholet	France	2 deaths, 7 injuries	Open-air show
14 August 2022	2022 Yerevan explosion	Yerevan	Armenia	16 deaths, 61 injuries	Warehouse
1 December 2022	"Magic in the Sky" warehouse blast	Orlando, Florida	United States	4 deaths, 1 injury	Warehouse
19 February 2023	Blitar fireworks explosion	Blitar	Indonesia	4 deaths, 13 injuries	House
29 July 2023	Sungai Kolok fireworks disaster	Su-ngai Kolok	Thailand	10+ deaths, at least 118 injured	Warehouse
26 September 2023	2023 Qaraqosh wedding fire	Qaraqosh	Iraq	107 deaths, 82 injuries	Wedding hall
17 January 2024	Suphan Buri fireworks explosion	Suphan Buri	Thailand	23 deaths, 7 injuries	Factory
7 April 2024	Death of Allen Ray McGrew	Summerville, South Carolina	United States	1 death	House
28 October 2024	2024 Nileshwar temple fireworks disaster	Kerala	India	4 deaths, 154 injured	Temple
7 December 2024	Bosa fireworks disaster	Bogotá	Colombia	1 death, 6 injured	House
1 January 2025	Aliamanu Fireworks disaster	Honolulu	United States	6 deaths, 20 injured	House
16 March 2025	Kočani nightclub fire	Kočani	North Macedonia	62+ deaths, 155+ injured	Nightclub
1 July 2025	Esparto, California fireworks explosion	Esparto, California	United States	7 deaths, 2 injured	Warehouse
2 July 2025	New Seabury Country Club fireworks explosion	New Seabury, Massachusetts	United States	8 injured	Open Air
3 July 2025	Pacoima neighborhood house fireworks explosion	Los Angeles	United States	1 death, 4 houses burned	House
18 July 2025	Düsseldorf fireworks accident	Düsseldorf	Germany	19 injured	Open Air
15 February 2026	Lianyungang fireworks accident	Jiangsu	China	8 deaths, 2 injured	Residential area
18 February 2026	Hubei fireworks shop explosion	Hubei	China	12 deaths	Warehouse
28 February 2026	Andhra Pradesh fireworks explosion	Vetlapalem, Andhra Pradesh	India	21 deaths	Factory
21 April 2026	Tamil Nadu fireworks explosion	Virudhunagar, Tamil Nadu	India	25 deaths	Factory
4 May 2026	Liuyang fireworks factory explosion	Liuyang, Changsha, Hunan	China	37 deaths, 51 injuries	Factory
1 June 2026	Malta fireworks factory explosion	Magħtab	Malta	2 injuries	Factory

== See also ==
- List of accidents and disasters by death toll
- List of industrial disasters
- List of nightclub fires (several resulting from pyrotechnics)
