= Puttingal Temple =

Hindu temple in Kerala, India

- Paravur Puttingal Devi Temple
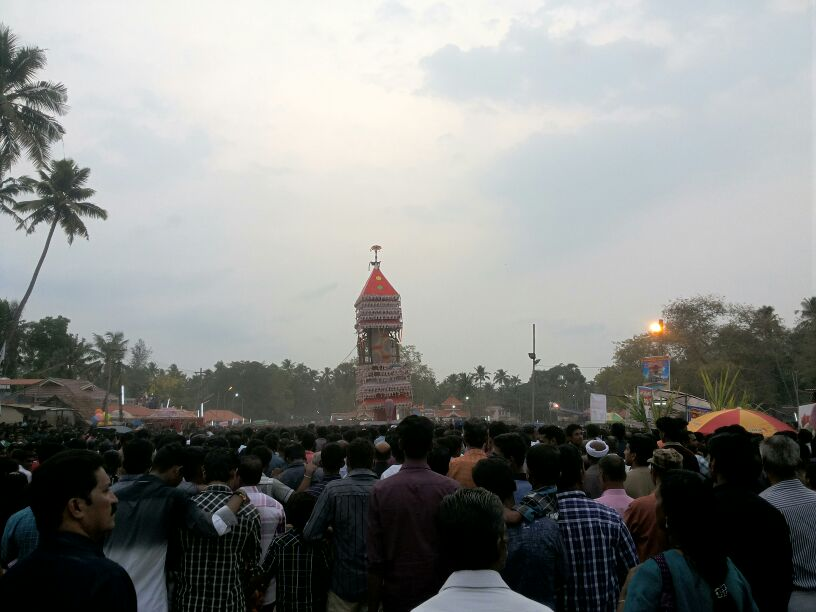
- Puttingal temple festival

- Location in Kerala

Religion
- Affiliation: Hinduism
- District: Kollam
- Deity: Bhadrakali

Location
- Location: Paravur
- State: Kerala
- Country: India
- Interactive map of Puttingal Temple
- Coordinates: 8°48′45.43″N 76°39′51.97″E

Puttingal Temple is a Hindu temple in the coastal town of Paravur, India. The temple was founded after the presence of the goddess was experienced on an ant hill with Puttu being the Malayalam word for ant hill.

The main festival is celebrated on the day of Bharani star in Meenam. Fireworks and other events associated with the festival take place along with other cultural events with various poojas performed.

== 2016 fire ==
On 10 April 2016, 114 people were killed due to a fireworks mishap at this temple, while over 350 other people were injured. A cracker fell on a shed where the fireworks were stored, setting off an explosion. Permission was not given to the temple by the authorities for the fireworks display and a case was registered.

== See also ==
- List of Hindu temples in Kerala
