= Wuwang Club fire =

Fire incident in Shenzhen, Guangdong, China

- Date: 21 September 2008
- Location: Shenzhen, Guangdong, China; 22.5583°N 114.054°E
- Type: Fire
- Cause: Ignition of ceiling by pyrotechnics Fireworks accident
- Deaths: 43
- Injuries: 88

The Wuwang Club fire was a fire incident that occurred in Shenzhen, Guangdong, China, on 21 September 2008, which killed 43 people and injured 88. It was a fireworks accident and nightclub fire.

== Incident ==
A fire broke out just before midnight on 21 September at the packed "King of the Dancers Club" (simplified Chinese: 舞王俱乐部; traditional Chinese: 舞王俱樂部; pinyin: Wǔwáng Jùlèbù; Jyutping: mou5 wong4 keoi1 lok6 bou6) according to an official with the Shenzhen Work Safety Bureau. The fire was started by a floorshow stunt involving pyrotechnics that ignited the ceiling, plunging the club into darkness and causing the patrons to panic and stampede towards the exits. The windows were boarded up and there was only one exit with a lit exit sign.

There were 308 people present in the club. Most of the deaths were caused by the crush of the stampede. Among the casualties were five people from Hong Kong, a 40-year-old man who worked in mainland China and four 18-year-olds; the latter group was celebrating the birthday of one of their peers.

The nightclub was operating without a building license and was not built according to building codes.

== Aftermath ==
Video footage aired by Hong Kong's Asia Television showed the smoke-filled nightclub after the fire. Overturned tables, broken glass and shoes littered the floor.

Guangdong's governor, Huang Huahua, blamed poor ventilation for the deaths citing something wrong with the architectural design. According to Hong Kong's RTHK 13 people were detained. Six people, including Wang Jing, president of the club, Zhang Wei, ex-husband of Wang and co-founder of the club, and four others of the club's management group, were charged with negligence and violation of safety rules. Another six people were charged with harboring criminals, according to police.

== See also ==
- List of fireworks accidents and incidents
- List of nightclub fires
- The Station nightclub fire, which was also caused by pyrotechnics
