= Xinjiang 61st Regiment Farm fire =

1977 fire in China

Coordinates: 44°15′19″N 80°29′46″E

61st Regiment Farm fire
- Native name: 伊犁61团场火灾
- Date: 18 February 1977; 49 years ago
- Time: 23:15 (Beijing Time (Note: All Chinese sources reporting this accident denote time in Beijing time (UTC+8). Some locals used Urumqi time (+6). See time in China.))
- Location: Alimali, 9 km NE of Khorgos
- Cause: Firecracker accident
- Deaths: 694
- Injuries: 161+

The 61st Regiment Farm fire occurred on 18 February 1977, at a frontier farm outside of Khorgos, Xinjiang, China. The fire broke out during a movie screening at the communal hall for Chinese New Year, when a 12-year-old audience member set off a ground-spinning firecracker, which ignited mourning wreaths for Mao Zedong displaying in the hall. Although the wreaths should have been incinerated months before, the regiment felt pressure to keep them. There was a crowd crush at the only exit.

694 people died and 161 were injured in the fire, mostly children of veterans. It is the deadliest fire in China since the foundation of the People's Republic and a major Chinese disaster.

== Background ==
=== Regiment farms at the border ===
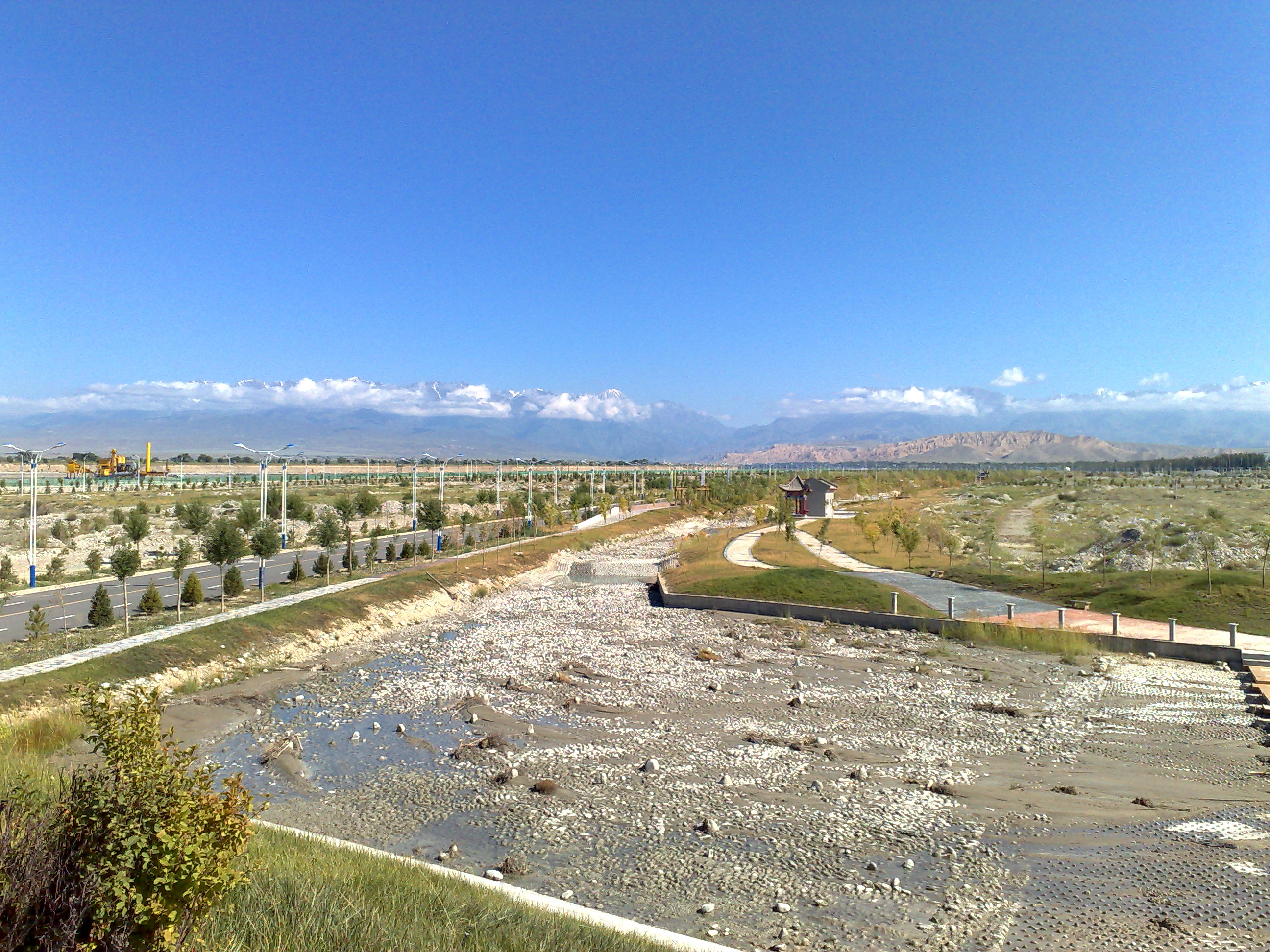
The landscape along the China-Kazakhstan border, 9 km from the 61st Regiment farm

Regiment farms (团场) are military settlements resided by veteran families, who formed the Xinjiang Production and Construction Corps. Frontier regiment farms (边疆农场) were created in Ili Kazakh Autonomous Prefecture, along the border to Kazakhstan (then a republic under the Soviet Union), after the Yi–Ta incident in 1962, which saw the flight of 60,000 Chinese citizens, predominantly Turkic and Russian, to the Soviet Union and ended in violent suppression of protests and unrest by Chinese authorities. The 61st Regiment's frontier farm is in Alimali, 9 km off the border city Khorgos. The tradition of soldiers settling in the frontier stemmed from the imperial policy tuntian.

The farm was located in Huocheng County, 9 kilometres (5.6 mi) away from the China–Kazakhstan border. The 61st Regiment is subordinate to the 4th Division of the Xinjiang Production and Construction Corps, headquartered in Kokdala, approximately 80 km away.

=== Large crowds expecting post-Mao new year ===
Following the death of Mao Zedong in 1976, the 1977 Chinese New Year drew excited crowds anticipating the first post-Mao era new year. Mao had been clamping down on folk traditions, especially new year traditions, ever since the 1952 Three-anti campaign and the "Destroy the Four Olds" period (1966-). The 3-day holidays of new year were cancelled in an effort to transform new year from a family occasion into a work units-led Maoist event. Without holidays, residents were encouraged to forgo the tradition of visiting relatives afar at new year. Ritual firecrackers at new year were also purged for years, but it was made available at the local cooperative in 1977. Mao-era new years were overshadowed by Maoist thought reforms and the Red August terror. As ancestor veneration had been outlawed, people instead worshipped portraits of Mao at new year, and popularized alternative new year greetings "wish you see Chairman Mao this year".

1977 marked the first time in 25 years in which the new year could be celebrated with traditional practices. This contributed to the particularly high number of attendants to the movie screening.

=== Pile of flammable Mao wreaths ===
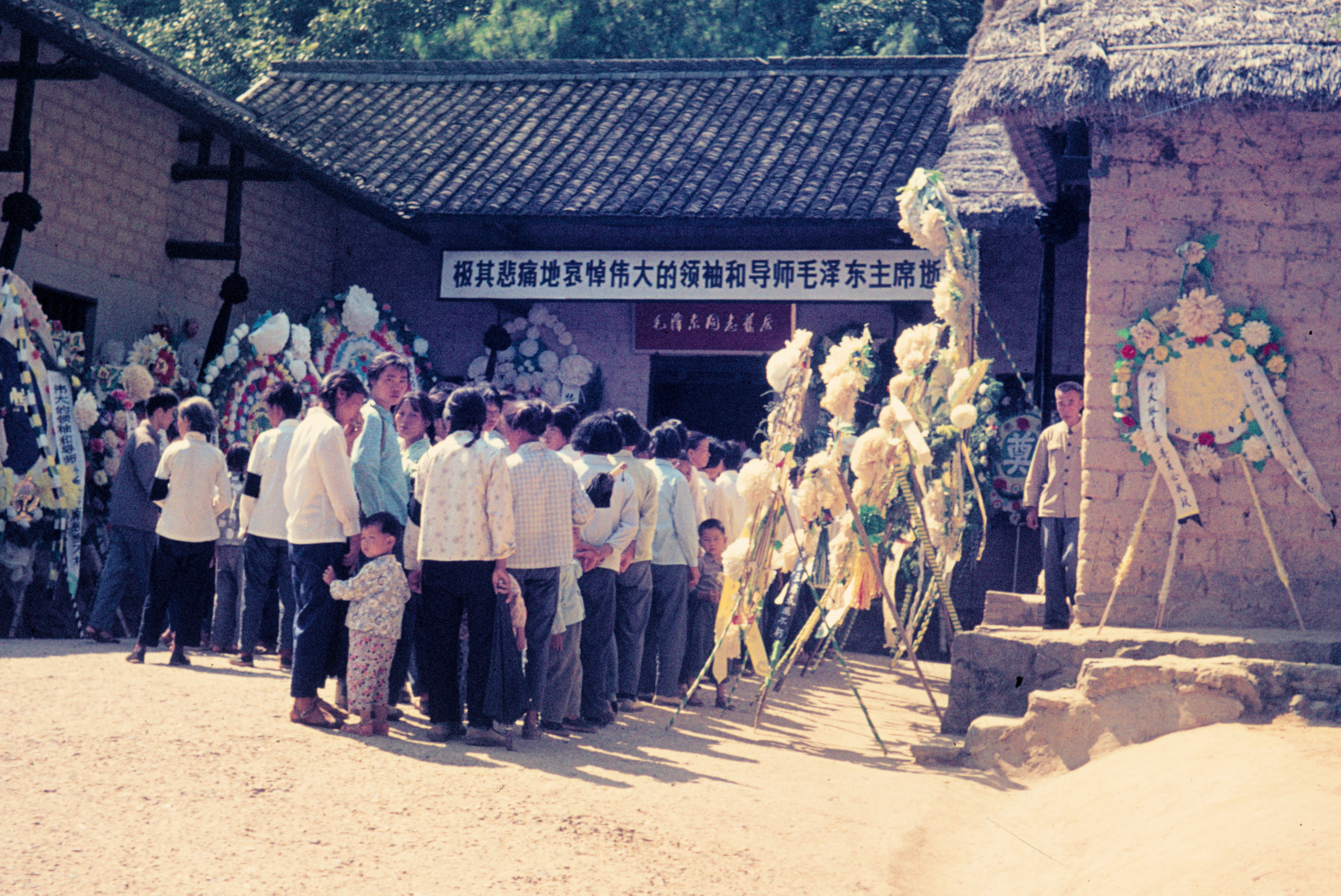
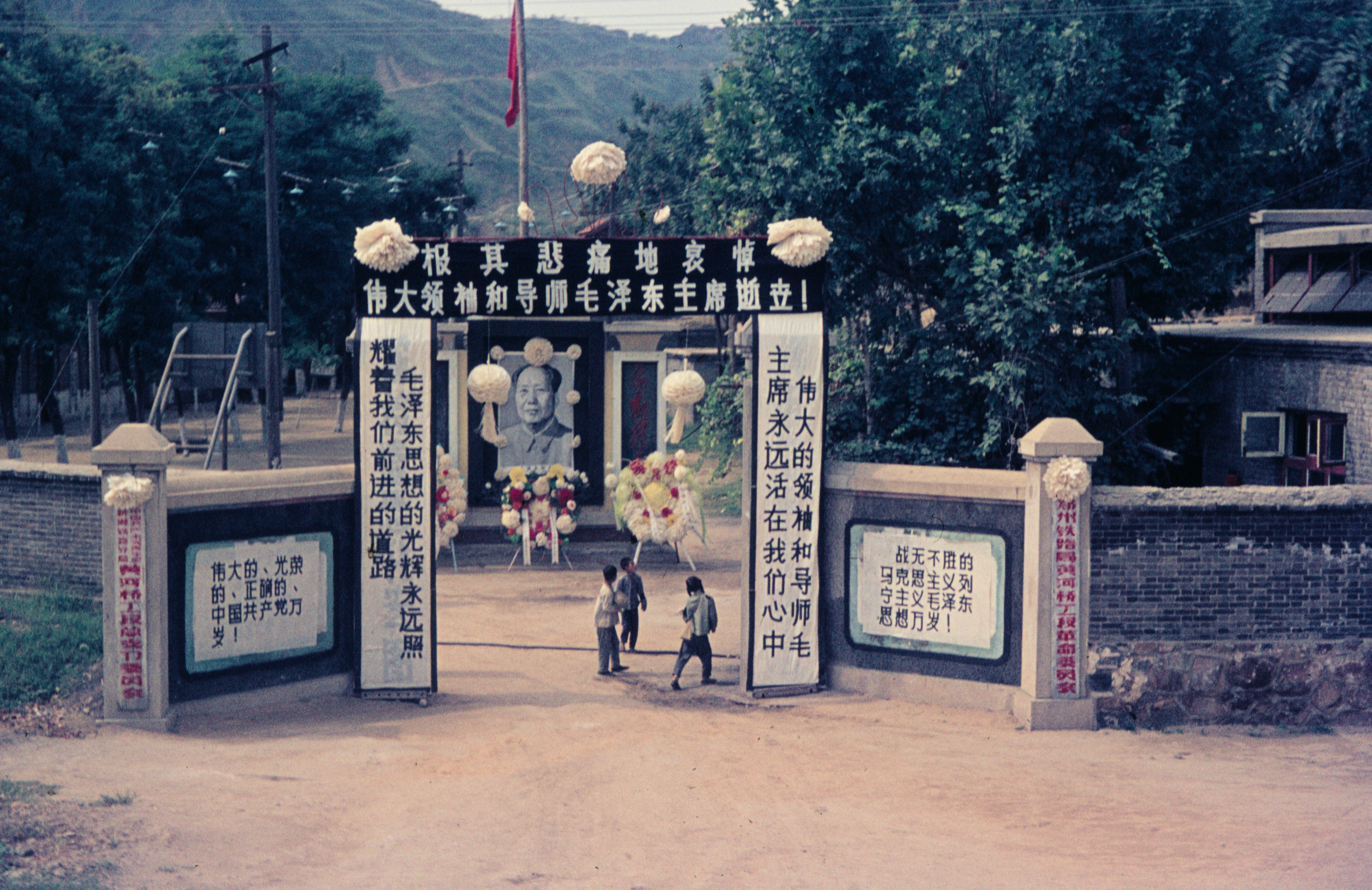
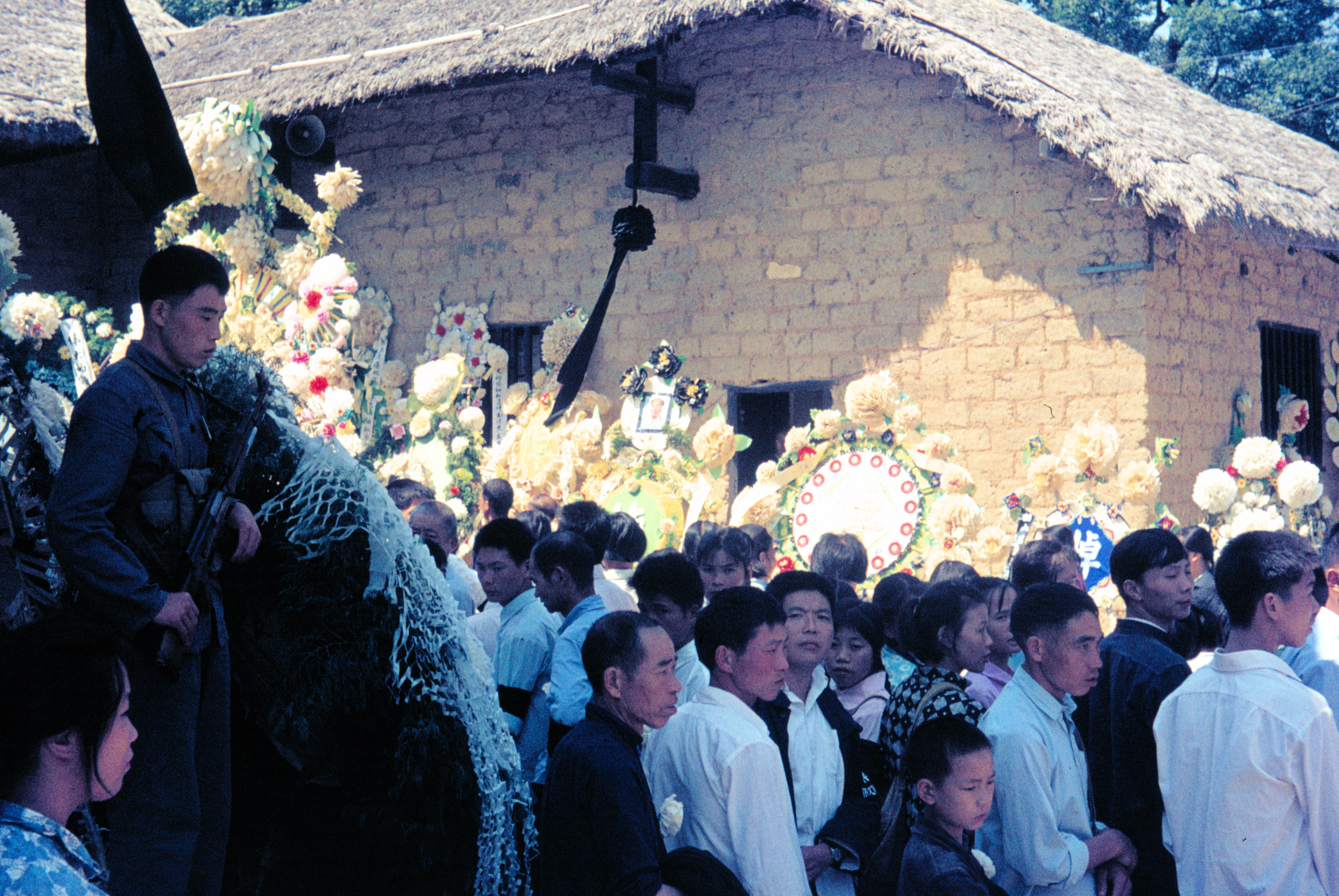
Wreaths for Mao were all over China in 1976.

After Mao Zedong died in September 1976, children were mobilized to handmake 1,000 mourning wreaths for him. By folk tradition, the wreaths, made of oil paper, would have been incinerated. (Note: Memorial wreaths are either incinerated or transferred to the deceased person's cemetery. As Xinjiang was far from Mao's cemetery in Beijing, incineration was the natural option.) However, the regiment felt that any mishandling would be smeared as disloyalty to Mao. Their superiors told them to keep the wreaths until further instructions. The regiment eventually put the 1,000 wreaths on display in the communal hall. The wreaths pile stood 2 meters high and occupied 120 m^{2} (1,300 sq ft), roughly one fifth of the floor.

During the 5 months from his funeral to the 1977 Chinese New Year, under Xinjiang's arid weather, the tree branches and paper in the wreaths dried out.

=== Exits renovation ===
The festival hall was built in 1966, primarily used for Mao-era denunciation rallies against people of the Five Black Categories. It had an area of 760 square metres (8,200 sq ft), with a usable floor space of 601 square metres (6,470 sq ft) and a wooden roof, with reeds, two layers of oiled felt and three layers of asphalt.

In 1975, to welcome Communist Party superiors coming for a policy information talk, the hall was modified to maintain privacy and order. The hall originally had 17 large windows and seven doors. Three doors were sealed and the other three were either locked or bound with steel wire, leaving only a 1.6-metre-wide (5.2 ft) main door on the south side of the building. They also bricked the lower part of the windows, leaving only seventeen 0.6 metres (2.0 ft) by 1.4 metres (4.6 ft) windowless holes. The height of the holes made it difficult to climb during escape. The unaesthetic modification of the hall led to locals comparing it to prisons and warehouses.

== The day ==
=== Movie showing ===
Maoist new year entertainment was dominated by communist movies, loyalty dances and revolutionary operas. At 1977 new year, the North Korean movie Jeon-u (전우; "Comrades"), a 1958 movie depicting the Chinese People's Volunteer Army intervention in the Korean War, (Note: known in Chinese official sources as "War of Resisting America and Assisting Korea") was scheduled to be shown outdoors. Due to temperatures around −20 to −30 °C (−4 to −22 °F), the screening was moved to the communal hall on short notice.

The regimental propaganda officer had reservations about moving indoors, fearing the children might damage the mourning wreaths for Mao Zedong displayed in the hall, but he was eventually persuaded. The wreath pile, standing 2-meters high, were pushed to the rear of the hall, occupying 120 m^{2} (1,300 sq ft) space.

=== Fire ===
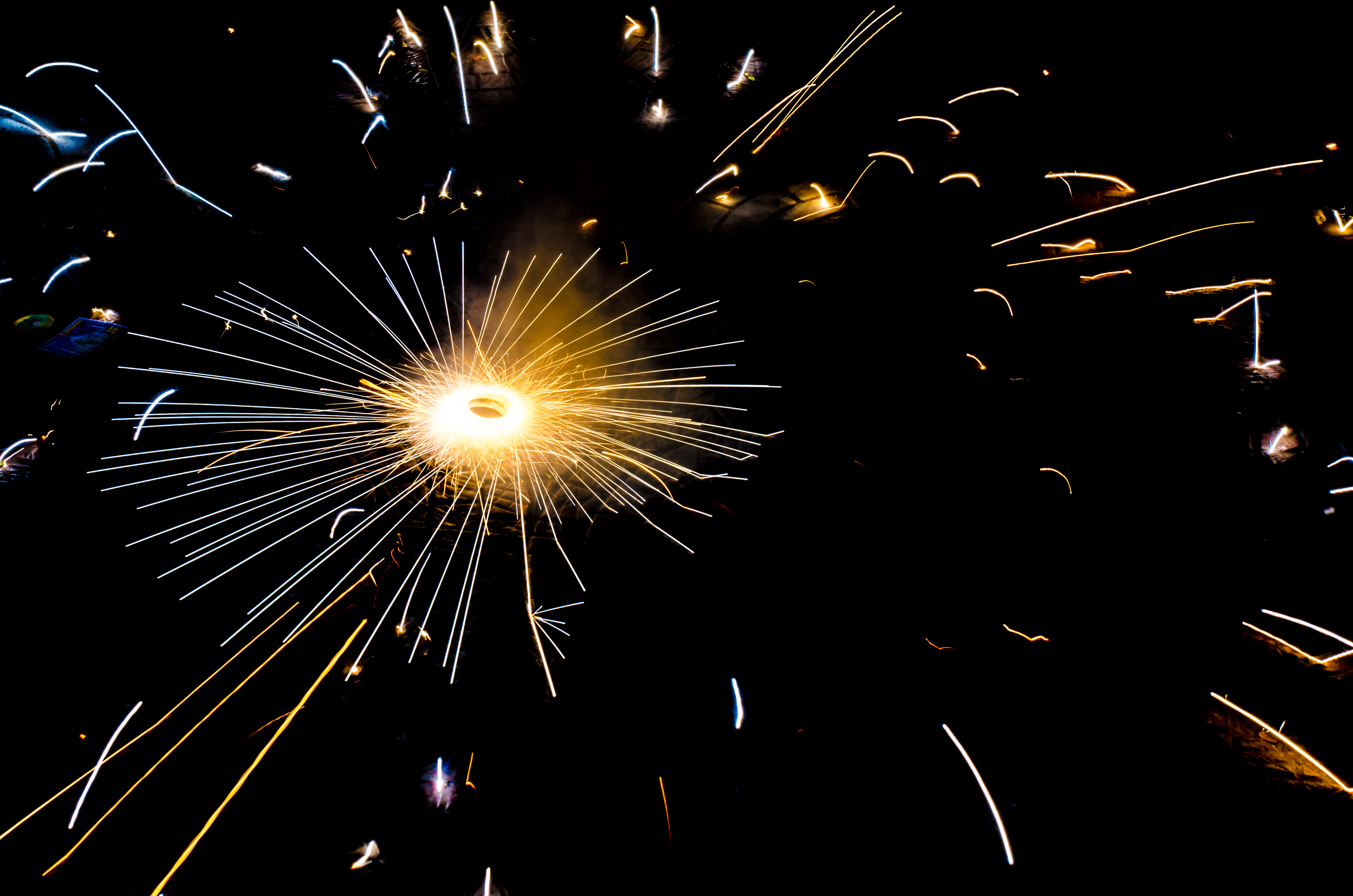
A similar spinning-top like firecracker

At 21:30, the movie started. Firecrackers were lit by children several times inside the hall during the movie-showing. The staff made announcements twice threatening to suspend the movie-showing should there be any more firecrackers.

At 23:15, minutes before the movie ended, at the iconic closing scene when a Chinese and a North Korean soldier hugged, several children climbed and sat on the slope of the pile of Mao Zedong's mourning wreaths. A 12-year-old boy (grade 6), Zhao Guanghui, lit a "burrowing rat" (地老鼠), a spinning top-like firecracker. It curved and spun into the wreaths, setting it on fire.

Children who had noticed the fire attempted to alert adult audience members, but the warnings were ignored by the adults, including the regiment's attending leaders, since they wanted to enjoy the first proper new year without disruptions, believing that the children were playing a harmless prank. Other adults who saw the fire believed that it would not spread beyond the wreath pile. Within a few minutes, wires mounted on the roof caught fire and spread dense smoke. The burning wooden panels and asphalt started falling off the roof.

=== Escape and deaths ===
There was only one small exit after renovation. Children who brought their personal stools to watch the movie carried their stools during escape, further blocking the exits. A crowd crush happened, with a pile around 2–3 metres (6.6–9.8 ft) high, while those unable to reach the exit were killed by burning asphalt or falling roof tiles. Eventually, a hole was smashed in a sealed door on the northern side, allowing a few children to be pulled out.

In total, 694 died and 161 were injured, some becoming permanently disabled. 597 of the victims were under the age of 16. The Tuanchang Sub-School district lost nearly a third of its roughly 1,600 students. Several children were left orphaned due to the death of parents and siblings in the disaster. Many spent numerous years undergoing treatment for lasting injuries, with some having suffered burns to up to 90% of their bodies. The deaths were mostly members of veteran families, who formed the Xinjiang Production and Construction Corps. This was the deadliest fire in China after the founding of the People's Republic of China, deadliest fireworks fire in China, deadliest cinema fire in China, and one of the deadliest disasters in Chinese history.

=== Body recovery ===
The 8th Border Regiment, based in Huiyuan, 80 km (50 mi) from the fire site, received a phone call from the Yili Military District. Two companies with a total of 280 soldiers were sent to the site of the fire. The night was dark and locals were under the belief that their loved ones trapped in the collapsed building were still alive.

The crowd cleared out a path, but the soldiers couldn't enter, as bodies were stacked nearly a meter high at the exit of the hall. Most of them were burnt to cinders, and some were stuck together like asphalt. The air was filled with a sickening stench so foul it was impossible to get close without wearing a mask. We held our shovels and pickaxes, not knowing how to begin the task at hand.

— Chen Fuyuan, (陈福元) commanding officer on site

Each soldier came equipped with a pickaxe, a shovel and two masks. Since there was a crowd watching, the soldiers felt it was more respectful to use their bare hands to retrieve the bodies rather than to use the metal tools, but they found it difficult to separate bodies that were sticking to each other using just their hands. It was more difficult to separate the bodies stuck at the top of the pile because snow had frozen on them. The cleanup lasted four hours. The bodies were gathered at the local school, where students with carpentry skills built coffins for the deceased.

== Investigation ==
The deputy communist party secretary of the Ili Prefecture, Ma Ji, led the investigation. Ma also became the acting chief of the 61st Regiment farm. Several relatives of the deceased blamed regiment leadership for the fire. There was particular anger directed towards the regiment farm's political commissar Zhou Zhengfu, whose daughter was also killed in the fire, since he did not make any public appearances despite repeated attempts at reaching out by affected townspeople. Some plotted to exhume the corpse of the daughter of Zhou and whip it in protest, but Ma Ji laid down on the grave and told the crowd that they would have to kill him to desecrate the grave. Ma ultimately convinced the mob that Zhou did not bear responsibility for the fire and that he was also grieving a family member. Similarly, when Public Security arrived, sent by party leaders concerned that the bereaved families might resort to violence, Ma convinced his superiors to not issue any arrest and leave the families alone under consideration of their emotional state. Ma organised the repatriation of many of the 61st Regiment farm's inhabitants to their original hometowns to reunite with extended family, asking other regiment farms to take affected residents in so that they would at least not be kept in constant proximity to the site of the disaster.

Internal Chinese propaganda initially claimed the fire was started by "class enemies" and those aligned with Soviet revisionism. By March 1977, the State Council acknowledged the lighting of firecrackers by children as the principal cause of the fire. Additional blame was cast on the farm regiment's leadership for collectively failing to prevent the mishaps that led to the large-scale fire, such as allowing the projectionist team to relocate to the ill-fitting communal hall, not stopping the children from lighting fireworks, not disposing of the mourning wreaths on their own accord, and not having an existing fire escape plan for the building in place.

The 12-year-old boy responsible for setting the firecracker escaped unscathed. Accompanied by his parents, he turned himself in to the authorities. He was sentenced to laogai labor and later to juvenile detention. After his release, he went to Guangdong and as of 2007, his whereabouts are unknown. The regiment farm staff in charge of the movie showing were detained for 29 months until the local court chose not to prosecute. It is presumed that they left Xinjiang for Hubei after release. Several other party leaders, both of the regiment farm and the Xinjiang Production and Construction Corps, were subjected to disciplinary measures and subsequently transferred to different farms and bureaus.

The non-disposal of the mourning wreaths of Mao Zedong and the exit renovation as contributing factors to the fire were not discussed on some media reports even many years later.

== Media non-coverage ==
The Soviet press picked up the news instantly because the fire was in close distance to the Kazakhstan border. During the Cultural Revolution era, Chinese media typically did not report accidents to not spoil the revolutionary spirit, as in this 1977 fire, the 1976 Tangshan earthquake and the 1970 Tonghai earthquake. The accident was not reported in China until 1995. It was then featured in several firefighter journals.

== Remembrance ==
Occasionally this accident was used to remind students of the danger of fire. It became an annual tradition by Alimali residents to mourn the deaths on each eve of 18 February by burning hell money at the site of the fire and graves of the victims.

A memorial park, named Jianyuan (鉴园) started construction in 1997 after bulldozing the remains of the hall. It was designed to be a theme park on fire safety, but was yet to be finished in 2007. The victims of the fire are buried at Sandapian (三大片; "Three Big Pieces"), so named as this cemetery was formed by joining three pieces of land.

== See also ==
- 1994 Karamay fire
- Fires in China
- List of disasters in China by death toll
- List of fireworks accidents
