= 2024 Nileshwar temple fireworks disaster =

Fatal building collapse in Kerala, India

Nileshwar temple fireworks disaster
- 2024 Nileshwar temple fireworks disaster (India) 2024 Nileshwar temple fireworks disaster (Kerala)
- Date: October 28, 2024
- Time: 00:30 IST
- Venue: Nileshwaram, Kasaragod, Kerala, India
- Location: Anjootambalam Veererkavu temple, Nileshwaram, Kasaragod
- Type: Fireworks accident
- Deaths: 6
- Injuries: 154
- Arrests: 8

On 28 October 2024, a fireworks accident occurred at the Theru Anjootambalam Veererkavu temple in Nileshwaram in Kasaragod district of the Indian state of Kerala. Six people were killed and around 154 people were injured.

== Explosion ==
On 28 October 2024, a Theyyam ritual performance was held during the Kaliyattam festival at the Theru Anjootambalam Veererkavu temple in Nileshwaram in Kasaragod district of the Indian state of Kerala. At about half an hour past midnight IST, a fire ignited in a nearby building where firecrackers were stored. The fire resulted in a blast which collapsed the building and injured people nearby. Investigations show that the fireworks were worth around ₹30,000 and were stored in a room.

== Aftermath ==
The Kerala Police were involved in the rescue activities along with the Theyyam performers and general public. More than 150 were injured in the accident and the injured were transferred to hospitals in Kannur and Mangalore for treatment. As on 29 October, at least 110 people were undergoing treatment for injuries with few people in critical condition. As on 4 November, four people had succumbed to their injuries. Six deaths and 154 injuries were recorded in the accident.

== Investigation ==
The Kerala Police opened an investigation into the accident. The District Collector of Kasargode stated that the investigation into the incident was being conducted by the appropriate authorities. The police highlighted a failure to comply with safety norms and guidelines as a possible cause of the accident. On 29 October, the police arrested eight temple officials including the president of the temple committee in connection with the incident. The Government of Kerala announced the formation of a special investigative team to probe the accident.

== Reactions ==
The witnesses described that the sudden explosion triggered chaos and panic amongst the people. Various leaders expressed grief and condolences on the accident. In the aftermath, clashes were reported between the workers of the Bharatiya Janata Party, who were protesting against the accident and the workers of Communist Party of India (Marxist), which heads the Kerala government.
