= Kiss nightclub fire =

2013 fire in Santa Maria, Brazil

Coordinates: 29°41′3.5″S 53°48′25″W

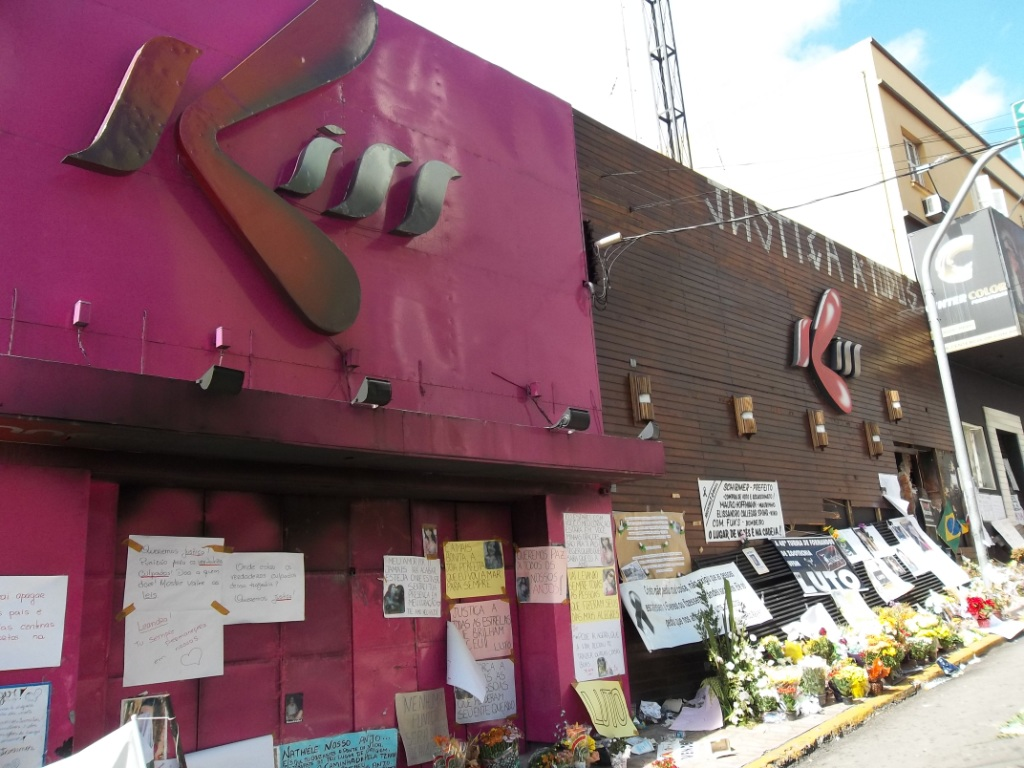
- The shuttered nightclub with flowers and messages from mourners
- Date: 27 January 2013
- Time: Between 2:00 and 2:30 (BRST)
- Location: Centro, Sede, Santa Maria, Rio Grande do Sul, Brazil
- Cause: Acoustic foam in the ceiling ignited. Fireworks-related accident.
- Deaths: 242
- Injuries: 630

On 27 January 2013, 242 people were killed and at least 630 others injured in a fire in the Kiss nightclub in Santa Maria, Rio Grande do Sul, Brazil. The fire started between 2:00 and 2:30 a.m. (BRST) after a pyrotechnic ignited acoustic foam on the club's ceiling. As the electricity failed, clubgoers were unable to find the building's only exit. It is the second deadliest fire in Brazilian history, surpassed only by the Niterói circus fire of 1961.

== Incident ==

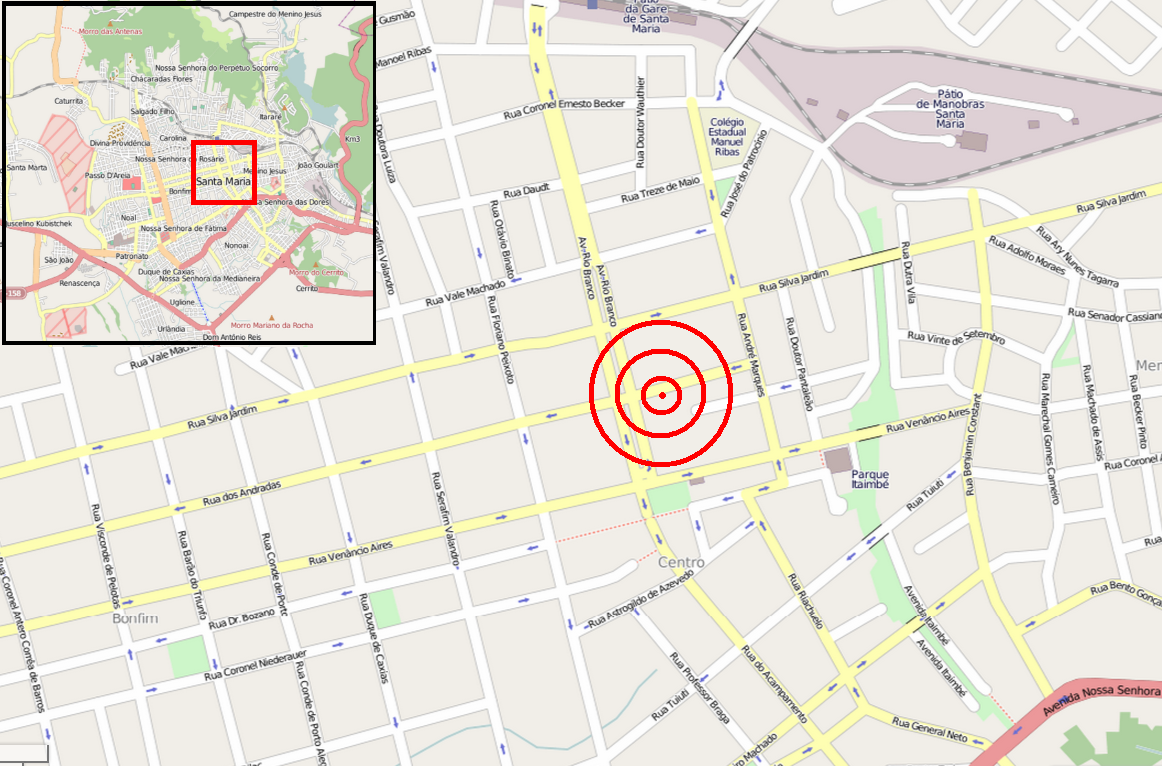
Map showing location of nightclub in Santa Maria

The party, called "Agromerados", organized by students from six faculties and technical courses at the Federal University of Santa Maria, began on Saturday, 26 January 2013 at 23:00 UTC. Two bands were scheduled to perform that night ("Pimenta e seus comparsas" and "Gurizada Fandangueira").

In the early morning hours of 27 January 2013, a fire broke out while students were holding a freshers' ball. A crowd crush occurred following the fire, and a lack of exit signs and emergency exits allegedly contributed to the deaths. Most of the victims were between 18 and 30 years old.

The fire began when the band Gurizada Fandangueira ignited a pyrotechnic device (similar to a signaling flare) while performing on stage. The pyrotechnics accidentally ignited flammable acoustic foam in the ceiling. According to the authorities, other reasons for the high death toll include the lack of emergency exits (the only access in and out of the building was the front door) and the fact that the number of people inside exceeded the maximum capacity by hundreds.

Colonel Guido Pedroso de Melo of the Rio Grande do Sul Fire Department stated that the club's front door was locked. De Melo told CNN: "This overcrowding made it difficult for people to leave, and according to the information we have, the security guards trapped the victims inside."

== Victims ==
About 90% of the victims died from smoke inhalation, specifically cyanide, which was among the toxic chemicals produced when fire consumed the soundproofing foam on the club's ceiling. This contributed to the high number of fatalities. Many people died as they either tried to hide in bathrooms or, in panic, mistook them for exits. At least 180 bodies were removed from the bathrooms. More than 150 were injured by the crush at the front door and the rapidly accumulating smoke within the nightclub. Fourteen injuries were attributed to severe burns, with eight victims succumbing to their injuries in the days and weeks following the incident. More than 90 people were hospitalized.

The fire has the second-highest death toll for an entertainment event in Brazil; it is second only to the 1961 Niterói circus fire, which killed more than 500 people.

== Investigation ==
Illustration of the nightclub fire

Based on an investigation and the accounts of survivors, the cause of the fire was found to be an illegal firework device that ignited the acoustic foam on the ceiling.

Two co-owners of the nightclub and two members of the band were arrested and questioned by police. One of the owners of the nightclub, Elissandro Spohr, tried to commit suicide while still being treated at the hospital. However, one of the police officers guarding his room noticed the attempt and intervened.

The state fire department found that the premises did not have enough emergency exits and that the nightclub was not authorized to use fireworks. The fire department, however, did issue a permit for the club to operate. The permit stated that the club had two emergency exits. The fact that false information was used by the club and approved by the fire department resulted in a state investigation of the authorities responsible for supervising the nightclub, including the city hall and the fire department itself. It was also reported that the fire extinguishers in the club may have been artificial or were disabled at the time.

On 30 January, the nightclub's owner deflected blame to "the whole country", as well as to architects and inspectors who were commissioned with ensuring the building's safety, according to his lawyer. By that time, the death toll was at least 235. The next day, officials inspected and closed more than 58 nightlife spots around the country as part of a crackdown on unsafe public spaces.

== Legal proceedings ==
On 2 April, two nightclub owners and two band members were charged with manslaughter.

On 1 December 2021, eight years after the fire, trial by jury procedures against the two nightclub owners and two band members commenced.

On 10 December 2021, the two nightclub owners were sentenced to 22 and 19 years in prison and the band members were given a jail term of 18 years each. However, on 3 August 2022, the verdict was overturned due to a flawed process of jury selection.

== Reactions ==
=== Domestic ===
Brazilian president Dilma Rousseff stated, "I want to tell the Brazilians and the population of Santa Maria that we stand together in this sad moment," before departing early from a summit of the EU and the countries of Latin America and the Caribbean in Santiago, Chile to visit grieving relatives of the victims. Rousseff declared three days of official mourning. Santa Maria's city government established thirty days of official mourning.

Organisers postponed a ceremony on 28 January in Brasília that marked 500 days to the 2014 FIFA World Cup.

The incident resulted in the inspection of safety features of thousands of nightclubs all over the country. In São Paulo alone, 60% of the nightclubs inspected were found to be operating against safety regulations.

=== International ===
- Argentina — Health Minister Juan Luis Manzur arranged the delivery of skin transplants for the injured, commenting: "We will make available to our Brazilian counterparts the amount of skin we can provide, according to the existence of it in our skin bank which operates in the Garrahan Hospital."
- Russia — President Vladimir Putin sent his profound condolences to President Rousseff.

== See also ==
- List of fireworks accidents and incidents
- List of nightclub fires
- List of fatal crowd crushes
