= Celaya fireworks disaster =

1999 incident in Celaya, Mexico

- Date: September 26, 1999
- Time: 10:30 CST
- Location: Celaya, Mexico
- Type: Fireworks accident
- Deaths: 63
- Injuries: 348

The Celaya fireworks disaster took place on September 26, 1999, a stockpile of illegally stored fireworks and gunpowder exploded in the Mexican city of Celaya, killing 63 people and wounding 348 others.

The fireworks accident was caused by the detonation of four tons of fireworks and gunpowder at about 10:30 local time, which triggered several more explosions of either fireworks or nearby gas cylinders. Fifty-two people were initially killed in the explosions, with 11 more later dying in hospitals.The explosion left 348 people injured and hospitalized.

Following the explosions, Mexican President Ernesto Zedillo announced that the government would conduct an investigation into the disaster. Authorities later arrested five business inspectors accused of illegally issuing permits, an agent of the attorney general's office accused of abuse of authority by failing to report the illegal trade, and seven business owners accused of illegally possessing and selling fireworks. Charges of being accessories to homicide were also brought against the inspectors and one of the business owners

== See also ==
- List of fireworks accidents and incidents
