= Lame Horse fire =

2009 nightclub fire in Perm, Russia

Coordinates: 58°0′49″N 56°13′55″E

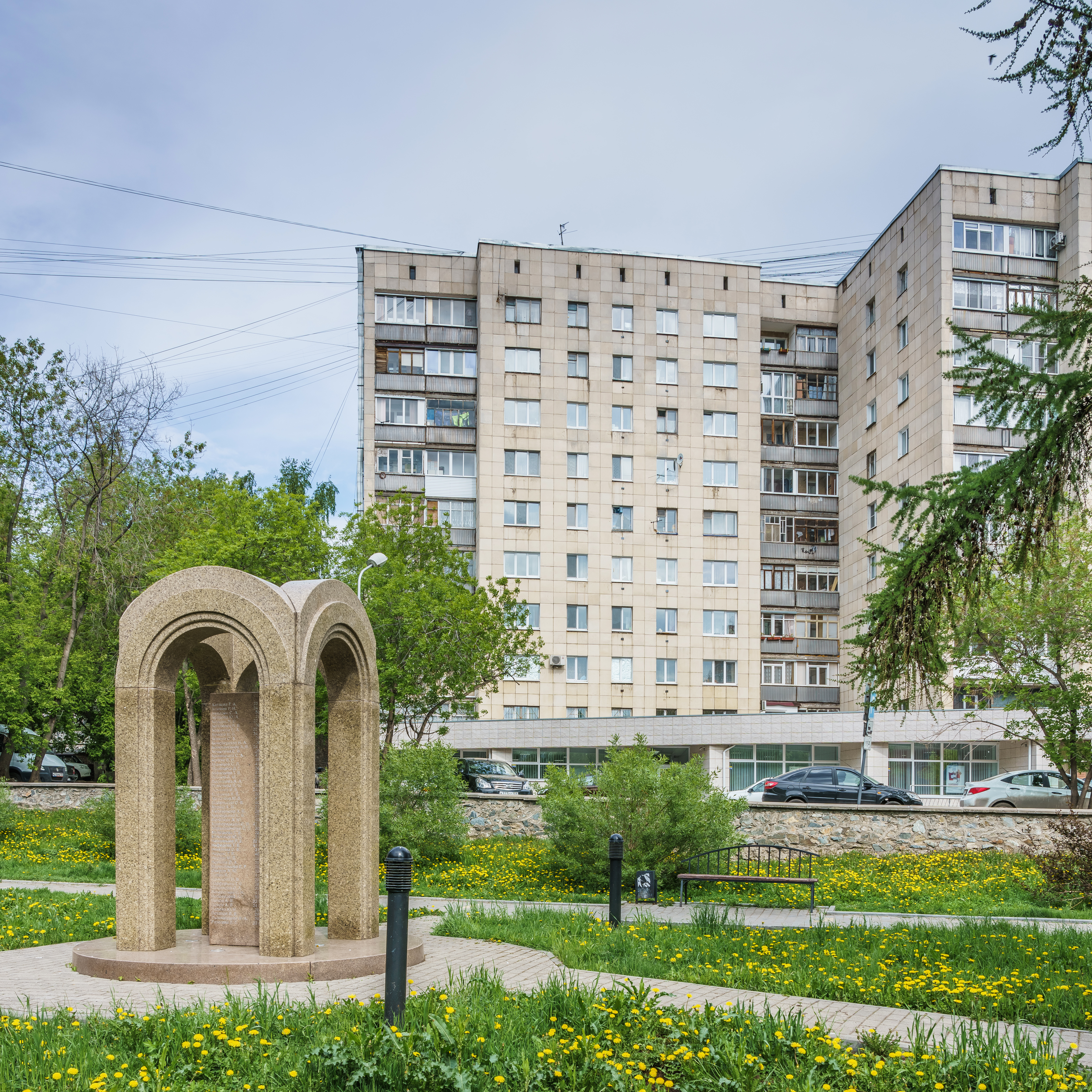
- Memorial to the victims of the Lame Horse nightclub fire; the building was physically located in the area behind the memorial
- Date: 5 December 2009
- Time: 01:08 YEKT (UTC+05:00)
- Location: 9 Kuybyshev Street, Leninsky City District, Perm, Russia
- Type: Fire
- Cause: Ceiling ignited by indoor pyrotechnics. Fireworks accident.
- Deaths: 158: 57 of them died in hospitals
- Injuries: 78

The Lame Horse fire occurred on 5 December 2009, around 01:00 local time (20:00 UTC) in the nightclub Khromaya Loshad (Russian: «Хромая лошадь», "Lame Horse") at 9 Kuybyshev Street, Perm, Russia. The fire started when sparks from pyrotechnics ignited the low ceiling and its willow twig covering. The fire quickly spread to the walls and damaged the building's electrical wiring, causing the lights to fail. This is a dual fireworks accident and nightclub fire.

The fire killed 158 people. According to initial reports, up to 160 more were injured in the fire, many of them losing their lives in the following days in hospitals. The nightclub was in the middle of a celebration of its eighth anniversary at the time. A total of 282 people had reportedly been invited to the club's anniversary party.

== Fire ==
Approximately 300 people were in the club for the club's anniversary celebration when the fire began. Ignition occurred when a performance artist threw cold-flame pyrotechnics into the air. Sparks from the fireworks hit the plastic covering of the ceiling, igniting it. The event's master of ceremonies then told the guests to evacuate. As the crowd began to calmly exit the building, the wooden decorations on the interior walls of the club ignited, and the building filled with smoke.

When the evacuation started, some people left via rear exits. The vast intake of oxygen turned the club's hall into a large fire tube and boosted the spread of fire. As fumes and smoke overtook the air, panic erupted and patrons stampeded toward the exit. According to witnesses, one leaf of the club's double doors was sealed shut, and the public was unaware of the backdoor exit behind the stage not shown by emergency lighting.

A club visitor's report about emergency service activity:

After I had got out, there were no firemen or emergency service for about twenty minutes—nobody at all. [...] There were only two ambulances altogether. They managed to take six or seven men and left. No more ambulance cars arrived, at least I saw none. Firemen had pulled out a number of people by then. Half-clothed, they were simply laid on the cold asphalt. Nobody cared for them. It seemed that the aid was needed but there were no ambulances. [...] People were lying on the ground for about an hour and a half. Definitely for no less than an hour. It could be that many of them died because of this. Because of the cold. It was 16 degrees below zero outdoors. These were the strongest impressions: people lying in snow for an hour without any aid.

Another report of a volunteer involved in evacuation:

I rushed to the ambulance which for unclear reasons was standing far off at the crossroads. I asked why they were idling and they replied that they hadn’t been given orders. It turned out that we pulled out a lot of people most of which were still alive. I think it was possible to save around 70 percent of them within first seconds. But nobody helped. [...] I drove to the 9th medical post. Asked a guard where the toxicology department was. Found the door of the admission room and started to knock but nobody opened it for a long time. Then they looked out saying that they would come out soon and vanished. So I came in by myself, delivered them a man and drove back. By that time the officials had already arrived and the place of tragedy had been cordoned. I ran to firemen, asked how I could help but there were enough men without me, so I went round looking for injured who needed to be taken to their homes. Most of the people whom we had brought out earlier were already covered.

156 people were known to have died as a result of the fire: 94 at the scene and the rest in hospitals. During three days following the fire, the Ministry of Emergency Situations (EMERCOM) used specially equipped "mobile hospital" Il-76TD aircraft to transport 65 injured to Moscow and 28 to Saint Petersburg. Most of the injured who were transported to Moscow and Saint Petersburg had poor prognoses for recovery. By December 2009, 35 fire victims in hospitals had very poor prognoses. Most victims in more serious conditions needed around two to three months of treatment and a year of rehabilitation afterwards, including multiple reconstructive surgeries.

One Ukrainian citizen died and another was injured as a result of the incident. The injured Ukrainian later died in a Perm clinic.

== Response ==
Russian Prime Minister Vladimir Putin dispatched two planes equipped to transport burn trauma victims. President Dmitry Medvedev sent many high-level government officials to Perm to aid the victims, manage the incident, and start the criminal investigation, commenting that those who started the blaze "have neither brains, nor conscience". Medvedev declared 7 December 2009 a national day of mourning.

In Perm, a hotline was established for residents seeking information about the injured or deceased.

== Aftermath ==
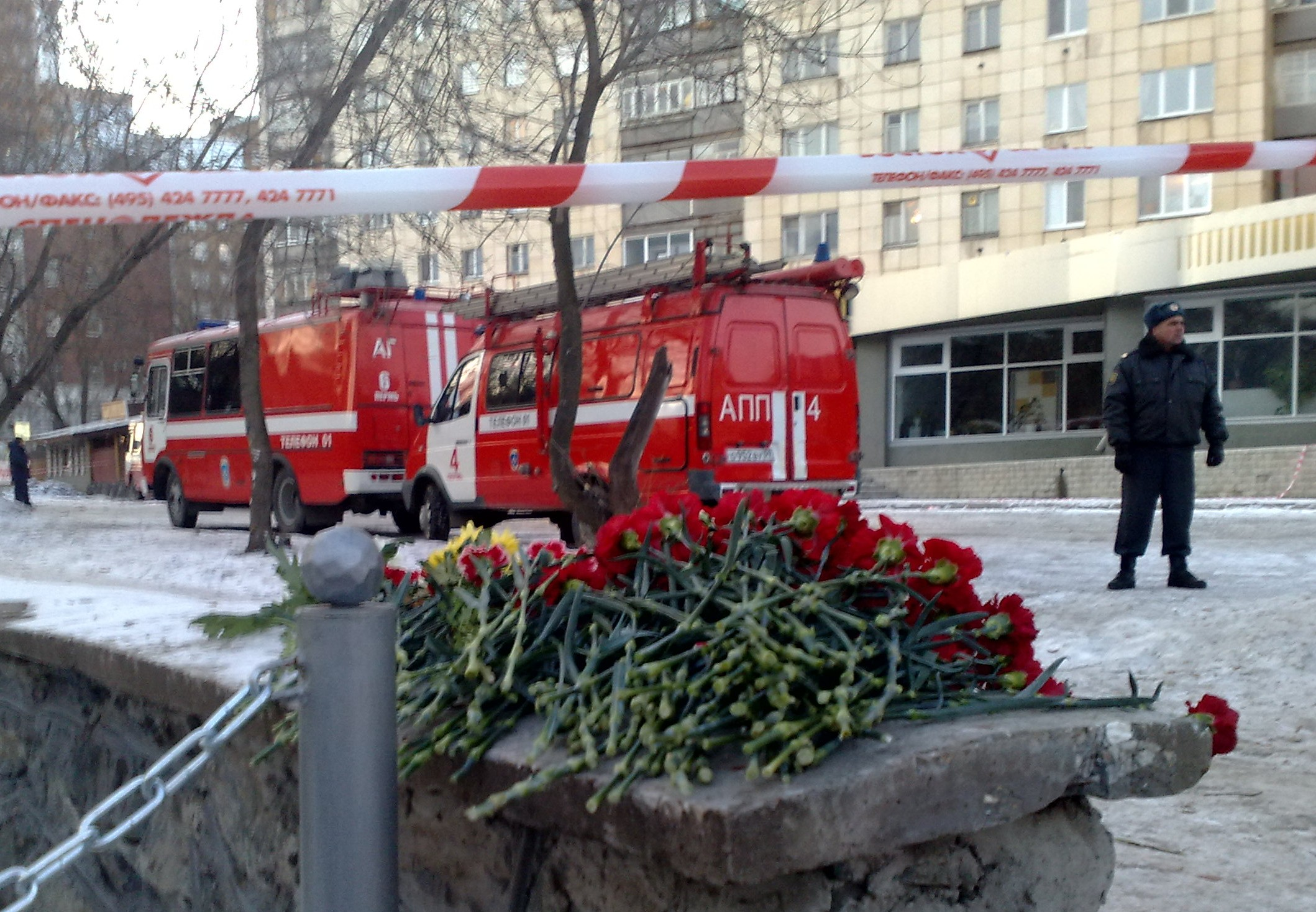
Flowers left in front of the club

Rumors have circulated that the incident was a terrorist plot, but the Russian Prosecutor's Investigative Committee spokesperson, Vladimir Markin, declared that the fire was caused by unsanctioned use of fireworks indoors.

The fire was the deadliest in Russia since the dissolution of the Soviet Union in 1991. The previous high death toll for a fire was in March 2007, at a Krasnodar assisted living home, which claimed 63 lives. There have been several other deadly fires in public places around Russia in recent years, attributed to the lax enforcement of fire safety regulations.

The disaster bears some similarities to the 2003 Station nightclub fire in the US state of Rhode Island, caused by the improper usage of indoor pyrotechnics which ignited the flammable sound-proofing foam in the building, killing 100 people. Some survivors and relatives of the victims of that fire expressed their sadness that a similar tragedy had occurred again.

An emergency services spokesperson stated most victims died from smoke inhalation and/or carbon monoxide poisoning. EMERCOM Sergei Shoigu issued a ban on fireworks at many upcoming New Year's and Christmas festivities, and President Medvedev ordered a complete review of fire safety regulations. Additionally, by mid-December, Moscow Fire Safety Authority motioned suspending activity of 54 nightclubs and cafes in Moscow alone after surprise checks of 450 facilities revealed safety violations on part of these businesses. Typical violations were lack of a fire alarms, bars installed on windows, and construction materials blocking walkways. Some contested court decision and were going to file complaints to prosecutor's office. Others, including popular Moscow clubs B2 and IKRA, fixed their violations quickly and resumed operations. Saint Petersburg Fire Safety Authority as a result of surprise checks motioned suspension of activity for 25 venues.

On 9 December 2009, the head of city administration Arkady Kats announced his decision to resign citing the disaster as a reason. On the same day, Perm Krai Governor Oleg Chirkunov accepted resignation of the local government. He announced that the new government will be formed only after the fire investigation is finished. On 11 December, Perm City Council did not accept Arkady Kats's resignation but instead suspended him from duty for a month. On 16 December, opposition party A Just Russia also called for Emergency Situation Minister Shoigu to resign.

During her Moscow concert on 9 December 2009, American singer Whitney Houston dedicated the song "I Look To You" to the victims of the nightclub fire saying, "I want to sing this song in memory of those who died in the Russian city of Perm".

== Investigation ==
On 5 December 2009, four persons were detained in relation to the Lame Horse fire. A court later authorized a two-month preliminary detention for the suspects on 6 December. One of the accused, Anatoly Zak, allegedly a coowner of Lame Horse, fled Perm but was later captured by Russian police. Zak has denied allegations of club ownership. Zak had an Israeli passport when he was captured, fueling speculations that he was trying to get to Yekaterinburg and leave Russia via Koltsovo International Airport.

On 7 December, four of the detained suspects were formally charged. Anatoly Zak, executive director Svetlana Yefremova, and caretaker art director Oleg Fetkulov were charged with violations of fire safety rules leading to the deaths of two or more people (Article 219, part 3 of the Criminal Code of Russia, carrying a maximum sentence of seven years). The latter suspect also lost his wife Yevgeniya Fetkulova on 13 December who was present at the club and suffered from multiple burns and smoke inhalation she received during fire. Investigators allowed Oleg Fetkulov to see his deceased wife for the last time at the local morgue before her funeral. Sergei Derbenyov, director of the pyrotechnics company Pirotsvet (Russian: ООО Пиротехническая компания 'Пироцвет') that supplied the incendiaries, was charged with negligent manslaughter of two or more people (Article 109, part 3 of the Criminal Code of Russia, carrying a maximum sentence of five years). The fifth suspect, Alexandr Titlyanov, a leaseholder of the premises who also owned 85 percent of the issued shares of the club, was heavily injured in the fire. Later, he was transported to a Moscow clinic with burns over 80 percent of his body and died on 9 December 2009 in a Moscow clinic before any charges were brought against him.

Investigators say the fireworks that started the blaze were outdoor pyrotechnics, prohibited for use indoors.

On 8 December 2009, during his visit to Perm, Russian Prime Minister Vladimir Putin acknowledged that local and federal officials were partly responsible for the fire. Later on the same day, EMERCOM dismissed seven officials from Perm Fire Safety Supervision Authority, including its chief and all his deputies. Investigators also found that a fire safety compliance report from 2003 was signed by an inspector who had been dismissed in 2002. The next annual fire safety inspection of the Lame Horse was due on 7 December.

According to Vladimir Markin, spokesperson for Investigation Committee of the Prosecutor General's Office, the court approved the motion to confiscate all property of Anatoly Zak. The main reason for the motion was the charges filed by the victims of the inferno. Anatoly Zak reportedly owned or had an interest in 28 commercial entities. Additionally, 18 pieces of property were believed to belong to him, including apartments, house, and real estate which he leased for profit.

On 11 December 2009, Vladimir Mukhutdinov, who was a chief fire safety inspector of the local Fire Safety Authority, was formally charged with negligence on duty leading to a death of two or more people (Article 293, part 3, carrying a maximum sentence of seven years). The court ordered Mukhutdinov's arrest later that day. Mukhudtinov felt weak in the courtroom and had to be hospitalized.

Initial findings by the investigation team suggest that the club premises certificate was obtained in 2007 in a fraudulent way. Officials had turned a blind eye, and there were no official checks of the construction work carried out around 2004–2006. Checks performed after the fire revealed some critically important differences from the original planning permission. By initial design, premises were to have large windows which would have allowed people to escape. Moreover, the club license officially allowed 50 visitors only. However, a new extension wall did not have any windows at all and large windows were bricked in leaving only two exits for several hundreds of people inside.

It was also revealed that the name of the club had not been registered by any of the tax authorities of Perm Krai, and taxes were not being paid.

== Trials ==
The formal investigation was completed on 4 June 2010 with indictments issued against Zak, Yefremova, Fatkulov, Sergei Derbenyov, his son Igor Derbenyov (who allegedly lit the fireworks) and Mukhutdinov. Also indicted were fire inspectors Dmitri Roslyakov and Natalya Prokopyeva (negligence of duty, article 293, part 3). The indictment for Zak, Yefremova and Fatkulov was reclassified from Article 219, part 3 to Article 238, part 3 ("production, storage, transportation or sale of goods, or providing a service without following safety regulations which led to death of two or more people", maximum sentence of 10 years). Zak was also indicted for tax evasion (article 198, part 2, maximum sentence of three years); that indictment could be removed if he paid back the taxes owed and penalties. Mukhutdinov was indicted for two counts of "misuse of authority" (article 285, maximum sentence of 10 years). The second count was added after the investigators found a 5,000-rubles gift certificate from one of the local alcohol shops in his office. He allegedly issued a permit to the store in question even though it did not fit the fire safety regulations. Another accused, Konstantin Mrykhin, was not in custody at the time, and international arrest warrant was issued for him (he allegedly was another coowner of the club, and was indicted on the same counts as Zak, Yefremova and Fatkulov). Mrykhin was arrested on 31 August 2010 in Barcelona, Spain and was expected to be extradited to Russia in late September or early October 2010.

The trial for the other indicted began on 20 September 2010. 304 people who were injured and relatives of the people who died filed civil suits against the accused for a total of about 2.5 billion rubles (approximately US$83,000,000). Zak claimed innocence, as he was only a passive investor in the club, and club affairs were managed by Titlyanov. Igor Derbenyov petitioned the court to excuse him from appearing in the courtroom due to health problems caused by the injuries he suffered in the fire, but that petition was denied after a medical examination. The trial had to be postponed several times, as the accused had to change the lawyers representing them, and one of the lawyers was hospitalized to give birth.

Court was adjourned until 25 January 2011 as Zak was hospitalized and operated on (part of his large intestine had to be removed), and even though it was unclear how long Zak's recuperation would take, prosecution said it was impossible to transfer Zak's indictment into a separate case at this stage of the trial. The judge decided to continue the trial after Zak's condition was reported to be satisfactory for him to appear in the courtroom. However, later the same day Zak had to be taken to the hospital again and the hearings were postponed again. Zak was once more reported by the doctors to be fit enough to participate in the trial on 27 January, but this time Igor Derbenyov asked to have his mental health evaluated by psychiatrists as he claimed he might have a mental disorder and be not guilty by reason of insanity. Derbenyov was judged mentally competent after a psychiatric evaluation. Derbenyov and Roslyakov were released on their own recognizance on March 1, leaving Zak, Fetkulov and Mukhutdinov in custody.

== Verdicts ==
Konstantin Mrykhin was convicted of "providing services not compliant with safety requirements, committed by an organized group by prior agreement, which negligently led to deaths of two or more people" (Article 238, part 3 of the Criminal Code of Russia) on 14 May 2012 and sentenced to 6.5 years of imprisonment (maximum sentence on that charge is 10 years, but Mrykhin pleaded guilty to the charges and therefore was not subject to a full trial; the maximum sentence in that situation is automatically reduced by 1/3). He was also sentenced to pay 200,000,000 rubles (approx. 5,000,000 euros) in compensation to the victims. Zak, Yefremova, Fetkulov, Mukhutdinov, Roslyakov, Prokopyeva, and Igor and Sergei Derbenyovs were found guilty, as announced by the court on 30 April 2013. Sentences were: Zak, 9 years 10 months of imprisonment; Yefremova, 4 years of imprisonment; Igor Derbenyov, 4 years 10 months of imprisonment; Sergei Derbenyov, 5 years of imprisonment; Fetkulov, 6 years of imprisonment; Roslyakov, 5 years of settlement colony; Prokopyeva, 4 years of settlement colony and Mukhutdinov, 70,000 ruble fine.

Zak was released after serving his sentence on 4 September 2018.

== See also ==
- List of fireworks accidents and incidents
- List of nightclub fires
