= Mexico City fireworks disaster =

1988 explosion and fire in Mexico City

- Date: December 12, 1988
- Time: 14:30 CST
- Venue: La Merced Market
- Location: Mexico City, Mexico
- Type: Fireworks accident
- Deaths: At least 62
- Injuries: Up to 83

On December 12, 1988, an explosion and subsequent fire triggered by illegal fireworks at the La Merced Market in La Merced, a neighborhood of Mexico City, killed more than 60 people.

The fireworks accident took place at about 14:30 local time, in an alley next to the main market. El País reported that the fire began when a gas cylinder used by a street food vendor exploded. According to one witness, a single crate of fireworks initially exploded, which triggered a chain reaction of more exploding firework crates. The fireworks immediately sparked a fire that spread to several nearby buildings containing shops and apartments, as well as almost 300 stalls in the marketplace. Fires continued for most of the rest of the day.

By nightfall on the 12th, 51 people had been confirmed dead by the Red Cross, with up to 83 injuries. By the 13th, the death toll had reached at least 60, with the fire department saying that 62 people had died and the police putting the number at 64.

In response to the disaster, Mexico city mayor Manuel Camacho Solis ordered the sale and use of fireworks in the city to be made illegal; previously, vendors selling fireworks were required to have a permit, while their use was unregulated. Local reaction to the ban was skeptical, as residents said that illegal fireworks vendors frequently bribed local officials, who then ignored complaints about the situation.

== See also ==
- List of fireworks accidents and incidents
