= Sivakasi factory explosion =

2012 explosion at an unlicensed fireworks factory in India

- Date: 5 September 2012
- Location: Sivakasi, Tamil Nadu, India
- Deaths: 40
- Injuries: 70

The 2012 Sivakasi factory explosion was an explosion at the Om Sakthi Fireworks Industries fireworks factory in Sivakasi, India, on 5 September 2012. Forty people were killed and more than 70 were injured. The explosion occurred in a fireworks factory which did not have a valid licence.

== Background ==
Sivakasi, in Tamil Nadu in southern India, is considered the "fireworks capital" of India. The town produces more than 90% of India's fireworks and India is the second largest producer of fireworks in the world, next to China. More than 700 factories in Sivakasi make approximately $360 million worth of fireworks every year.

The Om Sakthi Fireworks Industries complex consisted of a single larger factory unit and 48 ancillary units. The company's fireworks license had been suspended only days earlier for violation of worker safety rules. Local police officials stated that the factory should have been closed at the time, owing to the suspension. Instead, more than 300 people were working in the facility when the explosion occurred. With the Hindu festival of Diwali only weeks away, fireworks producers were reportedly under pressure to maintain high production levels.

== Explosion ==
The explosion occurred while workers were mixing certain chemicals to produce fireworks. Some reports suggest the high ambient temperature in the factory, reported to be 69 °C (156 °F), may have been a factor. The initial explosion and a subsequent series of explosions could be heard more than two kilometres away. Firefighter entry to the buildings was delayed by a lack of equipment, including breathing apparatus. Efforts to treat victims were also delayed due to inadequate facilities at several local hospitals. It took more than five hours for fire fighters to extinguish the fire.

The initial death toll was 37, followed by reports several weeks later of a final confirmed total of 40 deaths and more than 70 injuries. Fatalities included factory workers and local villagers who walked in after the initial fire.

== Aftermath ==
Immediately after the incident, authorities began enforcing existing regulations, conducting raids and inspections, forcing some factories to close and cancelling several licences and as a consequence, 150 fireworks production units had been closed. 12 people were arrested, including the factory manager, and were charged with culpable homicide. The owner of Om Sakthi Fireworks Industries absconded soon after the incident and could not be found by police. Responding to reports of the arrests, local authorities called for a higher-level inquiry into the incident.

The following day (7 September), Tamil Nadu Chief Minister Jayalalithaa Jayaram announced a "magisterial probe" to determine how the factory was allowed to continue even after its licence had been suspended.
