= List of mayors of Bucharest =

The coat of arms of the city of Bucharest, Romania

This article consists of several lists highlighting the political figures who, from 1864 onwards, have been serving as the mayors of Bucharest, the capital city of Romania. The article comprises a main list showcasing the mayors of the city proper as well as several other smaller lists displaying the mayors of the six constituent Sectors of Bucharest (i.e. Sector 1, Sector 2, Sector 3, Sector 4, Sector 5, respectively Sector 6).

== Mayors of the city proper (1864–present) ==
Political legend

National Liberal Party (PNL)

National Peasants' Party (PNȚ)/Christian Democratic National Peasants' Party (PNȚCD)

National Salvation Front (FSN)

Democratic Party (PD)

Military (General or Colonel)

Romanian Communist Party (PCR)

Social Democratic Party (PSD)/National Union for the Progress of Romania (UNPR)

| Nº | Name | Term start | Term end | Notes (political party) |
|---|---|---|---|---|
| 1 | General Barbu Vlădoianu | 7 August 1864 | October 1865 | Military |
| 2 | Constantin I. Iliescu | November 1865 | March 1866 | – |
| 3 | Dimitrie C. Brătianu | March 1866 | March 1867 | National Liberal Party (PNL) |
| 4 | Panait Costache | March 1867 | November 1868 | – |
| 5 | Panait Iatropol | November 1868 | March 1869 | – |
| 6 | Gheorghe Grigore Cantacuzino | May 1869 | January 1870 | Conservative Party (PC) |
| 7 | Eftimie Diamandescu | February 1870 | September 1870 | – |
| 8 | General Christian Tell | November 1870 | January 1871 | Conservative Party (PC) |
| 9 | C. A. Rosetti | January 1871 | March 1871 | National Liberal Party (PNL) |
| 10 | Scarlat Kretzulescu | May 1871 | December 1872 | – |
| (1) | General Barbu Vlădoianu | December 1872 | May 1873 | Military |
| 11 | Constantin N. Brăiloiu | June 1873 | September 1873 | – |
| 12 | General George Manu | October 1873 | April 1877 | Conservative Party (PC) |
| (9) | C. A. Rosetti | April 1877 | August 1877 | National Liberal Party (PNL) |
| 13 | Dimitrie Cariagdi | December 1878 | November 1883 | National Liberal Party (PNL) |
| 14 | Michail Török | November 1883 | January 1884 | – |
| 15 | Nicolae Fleva | January 1884 | April 1886 | Conservative Party (PC) |
| 16 | Nicolae Manolescu | June 1886 | November 1886 | – |
| 17 | Ion Câmpineanu | November 1886 | April 1888 | National Liberal Party (PNL) |
| 18 | Emilian Pake-Protopopescu | April 1888 | December 1891 | National Liberal Party (PNL) |
| 19 | Dimitrie Orbescu | December 1891 | June 1892 | – |
| 20 | Grigore Trandafil | June 1892 | February 1893 | Conservative Party (PC) |
| 21 | Nicolae Filipescu | February 1893 | October 1895 | Conservative Party (PC) |
| 22 | Petre S. Aurelian | October 1895 | December 1895 | National Liberal Party (PNL) |
| 23 | Constantin F. Robescu | January 1896 | April 1899 | National Liberal Party (PNL) |
| (21) | Nicolae Filipescu | April 1899 | June 1899 | Conservative Party (PC) |
| 24 | Barbu Ștefănescu Delavrancea | June 1899 | February 1901 | – |
| 25 | Emil Costinescu | February 1901 | April 1901 | – |
| 26 | Procopie Ioan Dumitrescu | April 1901 | November 1902 | National Liberal Party (PNL) |
| (23) | Constantin F. Robescu | November 1902 | December 1904 | National Liberal Party (PNL) |
| 27 | Mihail G. Cantacuzino | December 1904 | March 1907 | Conservative Party (PC) |
| 28 | C. Costescu Comăneanu | April 1907 | June 1907 | – |
| 29 | Vintilă I. C. Brătianu | June 1907 | February 1910 | National Liberal Party (PNL) |
| (26) | Procopie Ioan Dumitrescu | February 1910 | January 1911 | National Liberal Party (PNL) |
| 30 | Dimitrie Dobrescu | January 1911 | October 1912 | Conservative Party (PC) |
| 31 | Constantin Istrati | October 1912 | March 1913 | Conservative Party (PC) |
| 32 | Grigore Gheorghe Cantacuzino | March 1913 | December 1913 | Conservative Party (PC) |
| 33 | Ion Gheorghe Saita | January 1914 | March 1914 | National Liberal Party (PNL) |
| 34 | Emil C. Petrescu | March 1914 | November 1916 | National Liberal Party (PNL) |
| 35 | Colonel Victor Verzea | November 1916 | June 1917 | Military |
| 36 | Dem. Bragadiru | June 1917 | August 1917 | – |
| 37 | Ion Dobrovici | August 1917 | November 1918 | – |
| (34) | Emil C. Petrescu | November 1918 | December 1918 | National Liberal Party (PNL) |
| 38 | Constantin Hălăuceanu | December 1918 | September 1919 | – |
| 39 | Pandele Tărușanu | October 1919 | January 1920 | – |
| 40 | Gheorghe Gheorghian | January 1920 | February 1922 | Peasants' Party (PȚ) |
| 41 | Matei Gheorghe Corbescu | February 1922 | December 1922 | National Liberal Party (PNL) |
| 42 | Lucian Skupiewski | February 1923 | April 1923 | – |
| 43 | Ioan Emil Costinescu | April 1923 | April 1926 | National Liberal Party (PNL) |
| 44 | Anibal Teodorescu | April 1926 | July 1927 | – |
| (43) | Ioan Emil Costinescu | July 1927 | November 1928 | National Liberal Party (PNL) |
| (40) | Gheorghe Gheorghian | December 1928 | January 1929 | National Peasants' Party (PNȚ) |
| 45 | Dem I. Dobrescu | 5 February 1929 | 16 January 1934 | National Peasants' Party (PNȚ) |
| 46 | Alexandru Gh. Donescu | 21 March 1934 | 12 January 1938 | National Liberal Party (PNL) |
| 47 | Constantin C. Brăiesku | 12 January 1938 | 12 February 1938 | National Christian Party (PNC) |
| 48 | Iulian Peter | 12 February 1938 | 28 September 1938 | Independent (under King Carol II's royal dictatorship, all political parties had been dissolved) |
| 49 | General Victor Dombrovski | 28 September 1938 | 6 September 1940 | Military |
| 50 | Gheorghe Ion Vântu | 9 September 1940 | February 1941 | – |
| 51 | General Rodrig Modreanu | February 1941 | December 1941 | Military |
| 52 | General Constantin Florescu | December 1941 | October 1942 | Military |
| 53 | General Ioan Rășcanu | October 1942 | August 1944 | Military |
| (49) | General Victor Dombrovski | August 1944 | February 1948 | Military |
| 54 | Nicolae Pârvulescu | August 1948 | February 1949 | Military |
| 55 | Nicolae Voiculescu | February 1949 | December 1950 | Romanian Workers' Party (PMR) |
| 56 | Gheorghe Roman | December 1950 | December 1951 | Romanian Workers' Party (PMR) |
| 57 | Anton Tatu Jianu | January 1952 | June 1952 | Romanian Workers' Party (PMR) |
| 58 | Jean Ilie | July 1952 | March 1953 | Romanian Workers' Party (PMR) |
| 59 | Crăciun Blidaru | April 1953 | January 1954 | Romanian Workers' Party (PMR) |
| 60 | Gheorghe Vidrașcu | January 1954 | February 1955 | Romanian Workers' Party (PMR) |
| 61 | Ștefan Bălan | March 1955 | January 1956 | Romanian Workers' Party (PMR) |
| 62 | Anton Vlădoiu | February 1956 | March 1958 | Romanian Workers' Party (PMR) |
| 63 | Dumitru Diaconescu | March 1958 | April 1962 | Romanian Workers' Party (PMR) |
| 64 | Ion Cosma | April 1962 | February 1968 | Romanian Workers' Party (PMR) |
| 65 | Dumitru Popa | February 1968 | 24 April 1972 | Romanian Communist Party (PCR) |
| 66 | Gheorghe Cioară | 24 April 1972 | 1 June 1976 | Romanian Communist Party (PCR) |
| 67 | Ion Dincă | 19 June 1976 | 1 February 1979 | Romanian Communist Party (PCR) |
| 68 | Gheorghe Pană | 1 February 1979 | 16 December 1985 | Romanian Communist Party (PCR) |
| 69 | Constantin Olteanu | 16 December 1985 | June 1988 | Romanian Communist Party (PCR) |
| 70 | Radu Constantin | June 1988 | 7 February 1989 | Romanian Communist Party (PCR) |
| 71 | Barbu Petrescu | 7 February 1989 | 22 December 1989 | Romanian Communist Party (PCR) |
| 72 | Dan Predescu | 20 January 1990 | 23 July 1990 | National Salvation Front (FSN) |
| 73 | Ștefan-Constantin Ciurel | 24 July 1990 | 16 November 1990 | National Salvation Front (FSN) |
| 74 | Nicolae Viorel Oproiu | 18 November 1990 | 2 September 1991 | National Salvation Front (FSN) |
| 75 | Doru Viorel Pană | 3 September 1991 | 23 February 1992 | National Salvation Front (FSN) |
| 76 | Crin Halaicu | 23 February 1992 | 19 June 1996 | National Liberal Party (PNL) |
| 77 | Victor Ciorbea | 19 June 1996 | 11 December 1996 | Christian Democratic National Peasants' Party (PNȚCD)^{1} |
| 78 | Viorel Lis | 16 January 1997 | 26 June 2000 | Christian Democratic National Peasants' Party (PNȚCD)^{2} |
| 79 | Traian Băsescu | 26 June 2000 | 20 December 2004 | Democratic Party (PD) |
| — | Răzvan Murgeanu (ad interim) | 20 December 2004 | 2 April 2005 | Democratic Party (PD) |
| 80 | Adriean Videanu | 2 April 2005 | 19 June 2008 | Democratic Party (PD)/Democratic Liberal Party (PDL) |
| 81 | Sorin Oprescu | 19 June 2008 | 15 September 2015 | Independent (backed by PSD) |
| — | Ștefănel Dan Marin (acting/ad interim) | 15 September 2015 | 25 November 2015 | National Union for the Progress of Romania (UNPR) |
| — | Răzvan Sava (ad interim) | 25 November 2015 | 23 June 2016 | National Liberal Party (PNL) |
| 82 | Gabriela Firea | 23 June 2016 | 27 September 2020 | Social Democratic Party (PSD) |
| 83 | Nicușor Dan | 29 October 2020 | 26 May 2025 | Independent (backed by PNL and USR PLUS) |
| — | Stelian Bujduveanu (acting) | 26 May 2025 | 19 December 2025 | National Liberal Party (PNL) |
| 84 | Ciprian Ciucu | 19 December 2025 | present | National Liberal Party (PNL) |

Notes:

^{1} Served as Mayor until December 1996.
^{2} Served as acting/ad interim mayor while Victor Ciorbea was Prime Minister from January 1997 to April 1998.

== Mayors of the sectors of Bucharest ==
=== Sector 1 ===
| Nº | Name | Term start | Term end | Notes (political party) |
|---|---|---|---|---|
| 1 | Flor Pomponiu | 1992 | 1996 | PNL |
| 2 | George Pădure | 16 June 1996 | 18 June 2000 | PNL |
| 3 | Vasile Gherasim | 18 June 2000 | 20 June 2004 | PD |
| 4 | Andrei Chiliman | 20 June 2004 | 2016 | PNL |
| 5 | Daniel Tudorache | 6 June 2016 | 27 October 2020 | PSD |
| 6 | Clotilde Armand | 27 October 2020 | 1 November 2024 | USR |
| 7 | George Tuță | 1 November 2024 | present | PNL |

=== Sector 2 ===
| Nº | Name | Term start | Term end | Notes (political party) |
|---|---|---|---|---|
| 1 | Paul Popovăț | 1992 | 1996 | PNL |
| 2 | Vladimir Popescu | 16 June 1996 | 18 June 2000 | PNȚCD |
| 3 | Neculai Onțanu | 18 June 2000 | 23 March 2016 | PDSR/PSD |
| 4 | Mihai Toader | 23 March 2016 | 27 October 2020 | PSD |
| 5 | Radu Mihaiu | 27 October 2020 | 1 November 2024 | USR |
| 6 | Rareș Hopincă | 1 November 2024 | present | PSD |

=== Sector 3 ===
| Nº | Name | Term start | Term end | Notes (political party) |
|---|---|---|---|---|
| 1 | Constantin Tutunaru | 23 February 1992 | 16 June 1996 | PNȚCD |
| 2 | Sorin Paliga | 16 June 1996 | 18 June 2000 | PNL |
| 3 | Eugen Pleșca | 18 June 2000 | 20 June 2004 | PDSR/PSD |
| 4 | Liviu Negoiță | 20 June 2004 | 10 June 2012 | PD/PDL |
| 5 | Robert Negoiță | 10 June 2012 | present | PSD/PB 2020 |

=== Sector 4 ===
| Nº | Name | Term start | Term end | Notes (political party) |
|---|---|---|---|---|
| 1 | Eugen Bujoreanu | 1992 | 1996 | FDSN/PDSR |
| 2 | Marin Luțu | 16 June 1996 | 18 June 2000 | PNȚCD |
| 3 | Vasile Mihalache | 18 June 2000 | 20 June 2004 | PDSR/PSD |
| 4 | Adrian Inimăroiu | 20 June 2004 | 15 June 2008 | PNL |
| 5 | Cristian Popescu Piedone | 15 June 2008 | 4 November 2015 | PC/ALDE |
| 6 | Daniel Băluță | 4 November 2015 | present | PSD |

=== Sector 5 ===
| Nº | Name | Term start | Term end | Notes (political party) |
|---|---|---|---|---|
| 1 | Nicolae Bâzoi | 1992 | 1996 | PNL |
| 2 | Călin Cătălin Chiriță | 16 June 1996 | 18 June 2000 | PNȚCD |
| 3 | Marian Vanghelie | 18 June 2000 | 6 April 2015 | PSDR/PDSR/PSD |
| — | Dan Croitoru (acting/ad interim) | 6 April 2015 | 2016 | PNL |
| 4 | Daniel Florea | 5 June 2016 | 27 October 2020 | PSD |
| 5 | Cristian Popescu Piedone | 27 October 2020 | 12 May 2022 | PPU-SL/PUSL |
| — | Constantin Melnic (acting/ad interim) | 14 June 2022 | 22 June 2023 | PSD |
| 5 | Cristian Popescu Piedone | 22 June 2023 | 1 November 2024 | PUSL |
| 6 | Vlad Popescu Piedone | 1 November 2024 | present | PUSL |

=== Sector 6 ===
| Nº | Name | Term start | Term end | Notes (political party) |
|---|---|---|---|---|
| 1 | Nicolae Vrăbiescu | 1992 | 1996 | PNȚCD |
| 2 | Ion Dinuță | 16 June 1996 | 18 June 2000 | PNȚCD |
| 3 | Dan Darabonț | 18 June 2000 | 20 June 2004 | PDSR/PSD |
| 4 | Cristian Poteraș | 20 June 2004 | 10 June 2012 | PNL |
| 5 | Rareș Mănescu | 10 June 2012 | 5 June 2016 | PNL |
| 6 | Gabriel Mutu | 5 June 2016 | 27 October 2020 | PSD |
| 7 | Ciprian Ciucu | 27 October 2020 | 19 December 2025 | PNL |
| 8 | Paul Moldovan (acting/ad interim) | 19 December 2025 | present | PNL |
