= Corruption in Romania =

Corruption in Romania has decreased in recent years. In particular since 2014, Romania undertook a significant anti-corruption effort that included the investigation and prosecution of medium- and high-level political, judicial and administrative officials by the National Anticorruption Directorate. The National Anticorruption Directorate was established in 2002 by the Romanian government to investigate and prosecute medium and high-level corruption related offenses, using a model of organization inspired by similar structures in Norway, Belgium and Spain. Adrian Zuckerman, the US Ambassador in Romania, has stated in 2021 that "the rule of law has been strengthened in Romania". Since 2022, the effectiveness of the investigation and sanctioning of high-level corruption further improved, including by advancing on cases that had been pending for years for procedural reasons.

Due to the successful tackling of corruption cases while leading the Romanian DNA during 2013–2018, Romanian prosecutor Laura Codruța Kövesi has been assigned as the first European Chief Prosecutor.

== Background ==
After the fall of the communist regime in 1989, Romania has implemented a series of judicial reforms in order to bring itself to EU standards, such as the creation of the National Anticorruption Directorate in 2002, which would prosecute high-level cases of corruption. Since entering the EU, Romania has improved transparency and accountability in the public sector, although weaknesses still remained.

In 2012, the European Commission expressed concerns about the rule of law, pointing to the power struggle between Prime Minister Victor Ponta and President Traian Băsescu, which gave rise to what is called the 2012 political crisis. The commission also criticized Romania for failing to root out corruption in its state institutions. One year later, the Chamber of Deputies passed without parliamentary debate several controversial amendments to the Penal Code, including that the country's president, senators, members of the lower chamber, as well as lawyers are no longer to be considered "public officials". These actors can as a result take part in illicit interests without being held accountable for abuse of office, bribery, conflicts of interest and other corruption crimes. The amendments were sharply criticized by Romanian opposition parties and European leaders, while the Constitutional Court of Romania cataloged this move as unconstitutional. The proposed changes to the Penal Code were finally repealed due to large-scale civil protests in 2017.

Since 2014, an anti-corruption drive has been launched by the National Anticorruption Directorate, which led to arrests of many high-ranking officials in government, business, as well as judges and prosecutors.

Romania implemented the revised EU Public Procurement Directives in 2016 by passing new laws to improve and make public procurements more transparent. The National Agency for Public Procurement (ANAP) has general oversight over procurements and can draft legislation, but procurement decisions remain with the procuring entities. State entities as well as public and private beneficiaries of EU funds are required by law to follow public procurement legislation and use the e-procurement system. Sectoral procurements, including private companies in energy and transportation, must follow the public procurement laws and tender via the e-procurement website. The April 2021 EU Country Report for Romania, which included data on the public procurement system in Romania for the period between 2018 and 2020, noted that the practical application of innovation-driven public procurement solutions remained a challenge.

As of March 2022, Romania was implementing 12 commitments from their 2020-2022 action plan. This action plan featured commitments related to civic space, participation, consultation, social services, anti-corruption, fiscal transparency, justice and integrity, health and social accountability, de-bureaucratization, and open data.

== Colectiv nightclub fire and subsequent protests ==
In terms of scandals, corruption was cited among many issues that provoked the 2012–15 social unrest, the 2015 protests following the Colectiv nightclub fire, and the 2017 protests. Since the Colectiv nightclub fire, the Romanian civil society has been sensitive to corruption issues undertaken at political levels, in both parliament as well as the government.

== Asset and interest disclosure ==
In Romania, the electronic submission of asset and interest disclosures is mandatory since January 2022, though some challenges exist with regard to the effective verification of the submitted data.

== Statistics ==
According to Transparency International's annual Corruption Perceptions Index, as of 2025 Romania's public sector is ranked as the 70th least corrupt in the Index. The Corruption Perceptions Index scores the public sectors of 182 countries on a scale from 0 ("highly corrupt") to 100 ("very clean") and then ranks the countries by score. The country ranked first is perceived to have the most honest public sector. Romania's 2025 rank of 70th derives from a score of 45. For comparison with regional scores, the best score among Western European and European Union countries (Note: Austria, Belgium, Bulgaria, Croatia, Cyprus, Czechia, Denmark, Estonia, Finland, France, Germany, Greece, Hungary, Iceland, Ireland, Italy, Latvia, Lithuania, Luxembourg, Malta, Netherlands, Norway, Poland, Portugal, Romania, Slovakia, Slovenia, Spain, Sweden, Switzerland, and the United Kingdom.) was 89, the average score was 64 and the worst score was 40. For comparison with worldwide scores, the best score was 89 (ranked 1), the average score was 42, and the worst score was 9 (ranked 181, in a two-way tie).

In the 2014 EU Anti-Corruption Report, 57% of the Romanians were most likely to say they are personally affected by corruption (at par with Cyprus).

== Anti-corruption efforts ==
In 2014, the National Anticorruption Directorate indicted 1,138 authorities. Among them were politicians, judges and prosecutors, and businessmen.

In 2015, the number of filed cases against high-level politicians and businessmen that committed corrupt acts increased by an additional 1,250 people and has had a substantial social impact. Out of those people are Prime Minister Victor Ponta, 5 ministers, and 21 parliamentarians. There have been 970 final convictions throughout the year and the amount of damages recovered has increased to €194.37 million.

In 2016, 1,270 more people were brought to trial, including 3 ministers, 17 parliamentarians, 47 mayors, 16 magistrates, and 21 CEOs. The amount of damages recovered has increased to €226 million.

2017 marked the year where an additional 997 individuals were accused and found guilty by the National Anticorruption Directorate, including the former President of the Chamber of Deputies, 6 parliamentarians, 3 ministers, 49 mayors, 6 magistrates and 11 CEOs. The amount of damages recovered has decreased to €159.5 million.

In January 2017, the newly appointed government modified the Penal Code and Penal Procedure Code overnight as a way to fix the issue of overcrowding in prisons. Opponents released accusations that the government has actually modified the Codes as a way to decriminalize political corruption, to release former politicians from prison without punishment and to stop any accusations and investigations made to current authorities. 24 hours later, the biggest protest since the fall of communism was witnessed, with 300,000 civilians manifesting their opposition to the government's actions in front of Victoria Palace. In February 2017, the protests held reached an unprecedented turnout of 500,000 people. The anti-corruption measures taken by civilians resulted in the withdrawal of the bills and the resignation of the former minister of justice. Since then, multiple protests composed of hundreds of thousands of Romanians have continued as a way to tackle corruption within the government. According to the Seventh Framework Programme of the European Commission, the promotion of integrity, accountability, and transparency by civil society organizations have made significant contributions to the decline of corruption.”

== See also ==
- 2017–2018 Romanian protests
- List of corruption scandals in Romania
- Microsoft licensing corruption scandal
- Police corruption in Romania
- Crime in Romania
- International Anti-Corruption Academy
- Group of States Against Corruption
- International Anti-Corruption Day
- ISO 37001 Anti-bribery management systems
- United Nations Convention against Corruption
- OECD Anti-Bribery Convention
- Transparency International
