= Seki A Oe: A Crazy Samoan Love Story =

American Samoan 2013 film

- Film poster
- Directed by: Zena Iese
- Written by: Zena Iese
- Produced by: Tuugaolo Logotaeao; Alfred Tinitali
- Starring: Tai Williams; Kristina Vaeao; Princess Auvaa; Fa’afetai Ta’afua Ulu
- Narrated by: Reupena Paopao Sheck
- Cinematography: Alexander Zodiacal Jr.
- Edited by: Zena Iese
- Production company: Navigator Island Pictures
- Release date: 20 December 2013
- Running time: 85 minutes
- Country: American Samoa
- Languages: Samoan; English

Seki A Oe: A Crazy Samoan Love Story is a 2013 romantic comedy film written and directed by Zena Iese, filmed and set in American Samoa. The film is principally in the Samoan language, and the title means "you are awesome" in Samoan.

== Production ==
Director-writer-editor Zena Iese had previously produced a short film, Heart to Heart – Fatu O Le Alofa. Filming took place in Pago Pago; the ʻava ceremony scene was filmed at Veterans Memorial Stadium. The film was partially financed via FundRazr.

== Synopsis ==
Jack falls in love with Angel, but is rejected. Diana, a faʻafafine, coaches Jack on how to win a woman.

== Release ==
Seki A Oe: A Crazy Samoan Love Story had its world premiere on at the Governor H. Rex Lee Auditorium in Pago Pago.
