= Colectiv =

Colectiv may refer to:

- Colectiv nightclub fire, fire in Bucharest in 2015, which killed 64 people
- the original title of Collective (2019 film), a 2019 Romanian documentary film directed by Alexander Nanau
