= Romania's Reformation Nationalist Party =

Romania's Reformation Nationalist Party Partidul Naționalist Reformarea României
- Abbreviation: PNRR
- President: Cristian Popescu Piedone
- Vice-President: Laura Vicol
- Founder: Cristian Popescu Piedone
- Founded: September 29, 2025
- Split from: Social Liberal Humanist Party
- Ideology: Civic nationalism (Romanian); Populism; Pro-Europeanism; Atlanticism

Website
- https://pnrrpiedone.ro/

The Romania's Reformation Nationalist Party (Romanian: Partidul Naționalist Reformarea României, PNRR) is a political party in Romania founded by Cristian Popescu Piedone on 29 September 2025. According to Piedone, the party follows Romanian civic nationalism, open to Romanians of all ethnicities, and is in favour of Romania's membership in the European Union and NATO.

The party's name and abbreviation are inspired by the National Recovery and Resilience Plan (Romanian: Programul Național de Reziliență și Redresare, PNRR). Piedone had formerly been a member of the Social Democratic Party (PSD), as well as the Conservative Party, the National Union for the Progress of Romania, and the Social Liberal Humanist Party, all of which can be considered satellite parties of the PSD.

Laura Vicol is the party's vice-president and judicial advisor.

== Elections ==
For the 2025 Bucharest mayoral election, the party originally supported the independent candidacy of Anca Alexandrescu, but eventually endorsed PSD candidate Daniel Băluță instead.
