= Conservative Liberal Humanist Party =

Romanian political party

Conservative Liberal Humanist Party Partidul Umanist Conservator Liberal
- Abbreviation: PUCL
- General Secretary: Toni Greblă
- Spokesperson: Lavinia Șandru
- Founder: Dan Voiculescu, Maria Grapini
- Founded: 28 September 2015
- Split from: Conservative Party
- Headquarters: Piața Presei Libere nr. 1, Sector 1, Bucharest
- Ideology: Humanism; Social conservatism; Populism
- Political position: Right-wing
- European Parliament group: Progressive Alliance of Socialists and Democrats
- Colors: Blue
- Senate: 0 / 135
- Chamber of Deputies: 3 / 330
- European Parliament: 1 / 33
- Mayors: 0 / 3,176
- County Councillors: 0 / 1,340
- Local Council Councilors: 0 / 39,900

Website
- https://pusl.ro/

The Conservative Liberal Humanist Party (Romanian: Partidul Umanist Conservator Liberal, PUCL), formerly known as the Humanist Power Party (Social-Liberal) (Romanian: Partidul Puterii Umaniste (social-liberal), PPU-SL) from 2015 to 2020 and as the Social Liberal Humanist Party (Romanian: Partidul Umanist Social Liberal, PUSL) from 2020 to 2026, is a centrist political party in Romania. It was founded in 2015 by members of the Conservative Party (PC) who did not want to merge with the Liberal Reformist Party (PLR), led by Călin Popescu-Tăriceanu.

== History ==
In the summer of 2015, the Conservative Party (PC), led by Daniel Constantin, merged with the Liberal Reformist Party (PLR), creating the Alliance of Liberals and Democrats (ALDE). At the same time, PC MEP Maria Grapini opposed this decision, criticizing the disappearance of the party's ideology and announced that she would join a new group, the Party of Humanist Power (PPU).

== Ideology ==
When it launched in 2015, the party claimed to have a centre-right political doctrine. Later, the party began to reject the left-right political spectrum, promoting conservative humanism and traditional values as the third way. The departure of several people from the People's Movement Party into the Social Liberal Humanist Party strengthened the conservative outlook of the party.

The party also had populist rhetoric centered around its former leader, Cristian Popescu Piedone.

PUCL member Nicolae Păun claimed that the party promotes humanist and liberal values.

In 2026 the name of the party was changed to "Conservative Liberal Humanist Party"(In Romanian: "Partidul Umanist Conservator Liberal") and formed an alliance with the party of Claudiu Tarziu (ex-AUR member) to form the "Liberal Conservative Platform"

== Notable members ==
- Dan Voiculescu
- Lavinia Șandru
- Cristian Popescu Piedone
- Vlad Popescu
- Maria Grapini
- Liviu Pop
- Mugur Ciuvică
- Nicolae Păun
- Liviu Negoiță
- Gheorghe Ștefan
- Teodor Meleșcanu

== Controversy ==
In 2018, former Sector 4 mayor, Cristian Popescu Piedone join PPU and reentered politics, having previously been prosecuted for the Colectiv nightclub fire back in 2015. He was accounted responsible and in 2019 sentenced to 8 years in prison, but the sentence was not decisive and was attacked by the Bucharest Court of Appeal. With all the legal problems and controversy surrounding Piedone, PPU still endorsed him as candidate in the 2016 Romanian local elections for mayor of Sector 4 as well as in the 2020 Romanian local elections for mayor of Sector 5, winning the latter.

PUCL has also been labeled by the press as Dan Voiculescu's personal party, who has been described as the de facto leader of the party.

== Electoral history ==
=== Legislative elections ===
Election	Chamber			Senate			Position	Aftermath
Election	Votes	%	Seats	Votes	%	Seats	Position	Aftermath
2016^{1}	2,599	0.04	7 / 329	3,066	0.04	2 / 136	12th	Extra-parliamentary endorsement for PSD-ALDE government (2017–2019)
2016^{1}	2,599	0.04	7 / 329	3,066	0.04	2 / 136	12th	Extra-parliamentary endorsement for PSD minority government (2019)
2016^{1}	2,599	0.04	7 / 329	3,066	0.04	2 / 136	12th	Extra-parliamentary opposition to PNL minority government (2019–2020)
2016^{1}	2,599	0.04	7 / 329	3,066	0.04	2 / 136	12th	Opposition to PNL minority government (2020)
2020^{2}	70,536	1.19	4 / 330	59,465	1.01	1 / 136	9th	Extra-parliamentary opposition to PNL-USR PLUS-UDMR government (2020–2021)
2020^{2}	70,536	1.19	4 / 330	59,465	1.01	1 / 136	9th	Opposition to PNL-USR PLUS-UDMR government (2021)
2020^{2}	70,536	1.19	4 / 330	59,465	1.01	1 / 136	9th	Opposition to PNL-UDMR minority government (2021)
2020^{2}	70,536	1.19	4 / 330	59,465	1.01	1 / 136	9th	Endorsing CNR government (2021–2024)

Notes:

^{1} The MPs were elected on the PSD and ALDE lists.

^{2} The MPs were elected on the PSD list.

=== Local elections ===
==== National results ====
Election	County Councilors (CJ)			Mayors			Local Councilors (CL)			Popular vote	%	Position
Election	Votes	%	Seats	Votes	%	Seats	Votes	%	Seats	Popular vote	%	Position
2016	21,916	0.26	0 / 1,434	—N/a	—N/a	0 / 3,186	—N/a	—N/a	0 / 40,067	—N/a	—N/a	—N/a
2020	64,232	0.79	0 / 1,340	58,680	0.73	3 / 3,176	48,578	0.68	170 / 39,900	64,232	0.79	10th

==== Mayor of Bucharest ====
Election	Candidate	First round		
Election	Candidate	Votes	Percentage	Position
2020	Gabriela Firea^{1}	250,690	37.97%	2nd
2024	Cristian Popescu Piedone	111.411	15.14%	3rd

Note:
^{1} Gabriela Firea (PSD candidate) was endorsed by PPU.

=== Presidential elections ===
Election	Candidate	First round			Second round		
Election	Candidate	Votes	Percentage	Position	Votes	Percentage	Position
2019	Ramona-Ioana Bruynseels	244,275	2.65%	7th	not qualified		
2024	Did not contest						
2025	Lavinia Șandru	60,682	0.64%	6th	not qualified		

=== European elections ===
Election	Votes	%	MEPs	Position	EU Party	EP Group
2024	132,402	1.48	0 / 33	8th		S&D
