= Goodbye to Gravity =

Romanian metalcore band

Background information
- Origin: Bucharest, Romania
- Genres: Metalcore; heavy metal; nu metal; alternative metal
- Years active: 2011–2015: 2025 (As Goodbye To Gravity: The Momento Project)
- Label: Universal Music Romania
- Past members: Mihai Alexandru; Bogdan Enache; Andrei Găluț; Alex Pascu; Vlad Țelea

Goodbye to Gravity was a Romanian heavy metal band from Bucharest, active from 2011 until 2015, when four of the band's five members died during their concert in Bucharest, due to a burning firework that started the Colectiv nightclub fire. Lead vocalist Andrei Găluț was the only survivor.

== History ==
The band was created in 2010 and began performing publicly in 2011, opening for Swedish metal band Pain of Salvation. Frontman Andrei Găluț, who had previously won the Romanian talent show Megastar on Prima TV, enlisted the help of a full band, including former members of the Romanian band Thunderstorm, to get the band going.

In 2012, the band released their self-titled debut album to a warm reception and steadily built their reputation in Romania. As a result of the success of Goodbye to Gravity, the band was signed to Universal Music's Romanian branch, and played at festivals in countries such as Germany, Portugal, and Italy. In 2015, the band set to work on their sophomore effort, with more sci-fi themes to their music. The album was announced as Mantras of War with a release date of 30 October. To celebrate the release, the group announced a free show at the Colectiv nightclub in Bucharest.

=== Colectiv nightclub fire ===
At their Mantras of War release party on 30 October 2015 at Colectiv nightclub in Bucharest, the band's firework display set a deadly fire, greatly accelerated by polyurethane foam used in the club to dampen sound waves. 64 people died, while many more were hospitalized. Vocalist Andrei Găluț, bassist Alex Pascu, and drummer Bogdan Enache (also known as Bogdan Lavinius) were hospitalized with injuries, and guitarists Vlad Țelea and Mihai Alexandru were killed in the blaze.

Enache died on 8 November, while being transported to a hospital in Zurich, Switzerland. Pascu, who was moved to a hospital in Paris, France, and Găluț's girlfriend Mădălina Strungaru both died on 11 November. Universal Music Romania, whom the band were signed to, agreed to donate all proceeds from sales of Mantras of War to help the victims of the fire.

On the initiative of a German fan of the band, the names of the deceased musicians were engraved on a microchip on board of the NASA InSight lander. People from 230 countries were registered, including 8,000 from Romania.

=== Memorial project ===
In October 2025, Andrei Găluț launched The Memento Project, an acoustic re-recording of Goodbye to Gravity's "The Day We Die" and "The Cage," presented in video form. The charitable music project collaborated with ten surviving musicians (including Găluț) of the Colectiv fire to honor the victims of the tragedy, including the members of Goodbye to Gravity.

The Memento Project has marked the first public appearance of Găluț since the Colectiv fire, due to various medical treatments and reconstructive surgeries.

== Band members ==
- Andrei Găluț – vocals
- Mihai Alexandru – guitars (2011-2015, died 2015)
- Vlad Țelea – guitars, backing vocals (2011-2015, died 2015)
- Alex Pascu – bass, backing vocals (2011-2015, died 2015)
- Bogdan Enache – drums (2011-2015, died 2015)

== Discography ==
- Goodbye to Gravity (2012)
- Mantras of War (2015)
