= 2015 Romanian protests =

Protests over the Colectiv nightclub fire

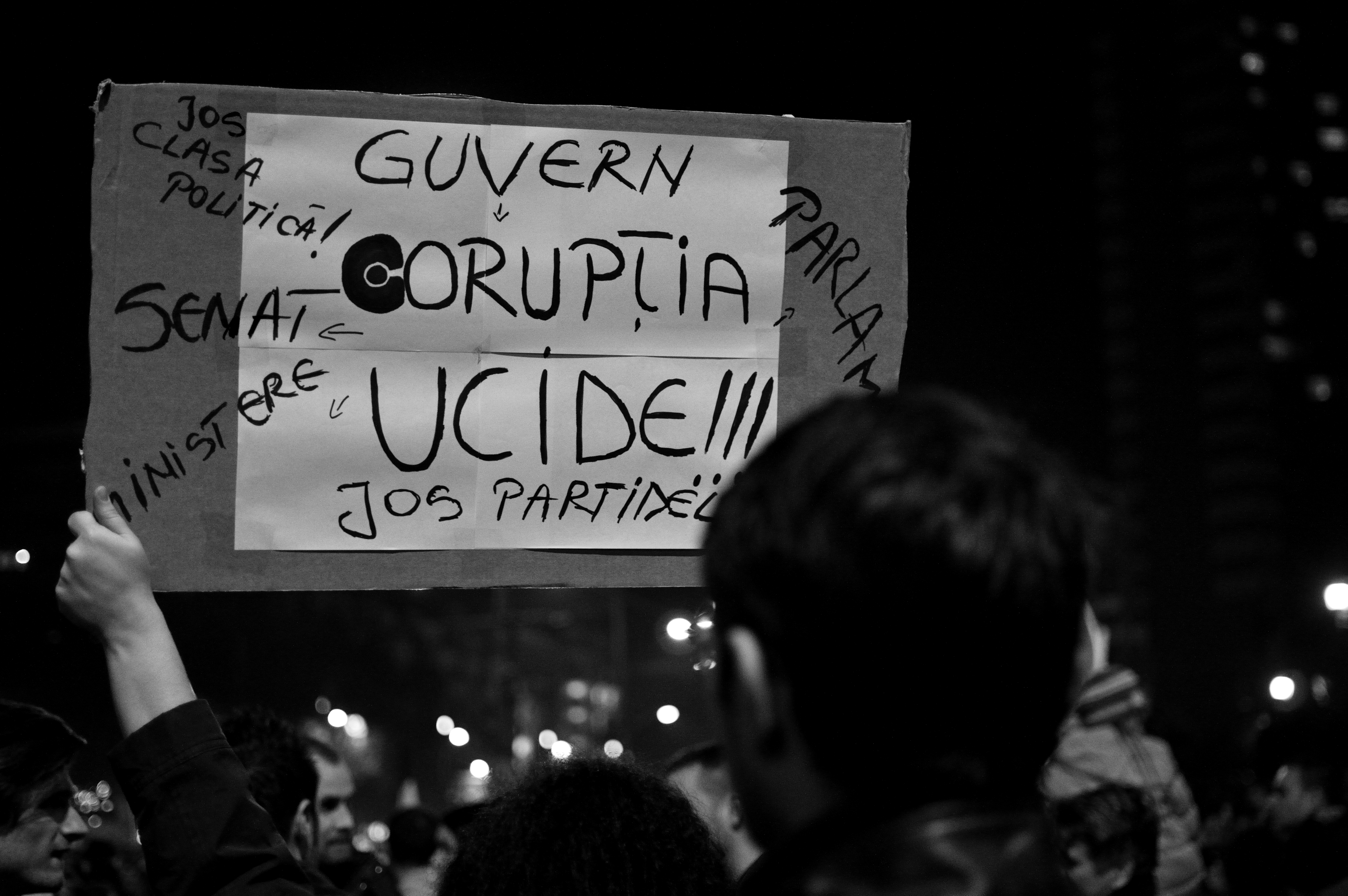
- Demonstrations at University Square, Bucharest
- Date: 3 – 9 November 2015
- Location: Many cities in Romania, including Bucharest, Constanța, Timișoara, Craiova, Iași, Cluj-Napoca, Galați, Sibiu, Brașov, Oradea, Suceava, Focșani (United Kingdom) London (France) Paris (Spain) Madrid (Italy) Turin (Germany) Berlin (United States) New York City
- Goals: Resignation of Victor Ponta; Early elections; Resignation of Mayor Cristian Popescu Piedone; Dissolution of parliament
- Methods: Demonstrations; Protest marches; Sit-ins; Occupations; Online activism
- Result: Concluded: Resignation of Prime Minister Victor Ponta and his cabinet; Resignation of Cristian Popescu Piedone, Mayor of Sector 4

Lead figures
none	

Number
Up to 100,000 participants throughout Romania	

The 2015 Romanian protests began on 3 November, following the Colectiv nightclub fire, when more than 15,000 people protested in front of Victoria Palace—the headquarters of the Romanian government—blocking traffic in Victory Square.

The protesters demanded the resignations of Prime Minister Victor Ponta and Minister Gabriel Oprea, who they claimed fostered corruption which led to the disaster. They also called for the resignation of Cristian Popescu Piedone, the Mayor of Sector 4, who was criticized for giving an operating license to the club without a permit from the fire department.

== Protests ==
=== 3 November ===
On 3 November 2015, large cordons of gendarmes prevented demonstrators from advancing toward the governmental building. From Victory Square, protesters marched to the Interior Ministry, where they knelt and held a moment of silence. The protesters chanted "shame on you" and "assassins", and carried banners reading "corruption kills". By 10 p.m. local time, between 28,000 and 30,000 people (some estimates had more than 35,000) reached Constitution Square, with some protesters scaling the fences surrounding the Palace of the Parliament. Protests were also held in Brașov, Ploiești, and Iași. President Klaus Iohannis welcomed the street demonstrations, and cautioned that such events cannot be ignored by the political class.

Protesters also criticized the Romanian Orthodox Church and its leader, Patriarch Daniel, for their apparent lack of reaction in the aftermath of the club fire. Thousands of demonstrators marched on Dealul Mitropoliei in central Bucharest, where the seat of the Church is located.

=== 4 November ===
On the morning of 4 November, the Ponta government resigned, but with Ponta himself remaining as acting prime minister until the formation of a new government. "I hope the government's resignation will satisfy the people who came out in the streets", Ponta said in a statement. Pressure had been mounting on Ponta for the previous month. In October 2015, he lost the Social Democratic Party leadership to Liviu Dragnea amid a tax fraud scandal, and became the country's first sitting premier to stand trial for corruption. One hour after the announcement of the government's resignation, Piedone also announced his resignation. He accepted his role in the tragedy, and expressed regret for his actions and inaction, stating: "It is a mistake and I undertake that I did not proceed to the resignation from the first day or second day after the accident".

On 4 November, protests continued for a second consecutive night despite Ponta's resignation, with about 35,000 people in Bucharest, 10,000 in Timișoara, 5,000 in Craiova and Iași, 4,500 in Cluj-Napoca, 4,000 in Sibiu, 3,000 in Bacău, Constanța, Galați and Suceava, 1,000 in Oradea and Focșani. Demonstrators demanded early elections and a total change of the political class. Protests in solidarity with those in Romania took place in London and Paris.

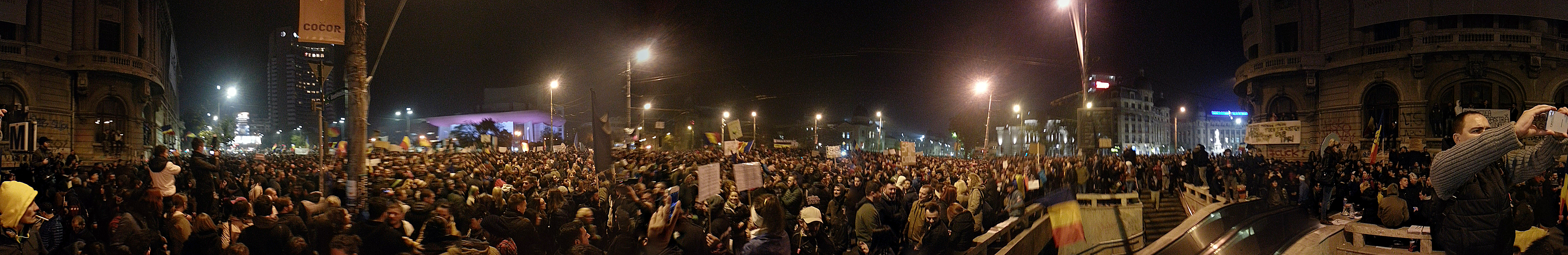
People protesting in University Square, Bucharest, on 5 November

=== Following days ===
On 5 November, around 12,000 people protested in Bucharest and 10,000 in other big cities. For the first time the president invited representatives from street people to a round of consultations to hear their demands. After the Presidential Administration centralized 5,520 proposals, 20 people, mostly members of NGOs, were chosen to take part in consultations with Klaus Iohannis.

The next day, on 6 November, people kept protesting, although in fewer numbers (6,000 in Bucharest and several thousands in other cities). The president told the civil representatives that he will come incognito to talk to people in the streets, indirectly hinting that if they want true change they need to keep asking for it so the politicians can not pretend they do not understand what is asked of them.

On 8 November, in the seventh day of protests, Klaus Iohannis went to University Square, where he talked with some protesters and listened to their demands. While many expressed gladness at president's presence in the square, others booed, whistled and chanted "Shame on you", "Resignation", "Thieves" and "We don't want you".

== See also ==
- Corruption in Romania
