= Corruption in Cyprus =

Corruption in Cyprus is a salient concern for people in Cyprus: As of 2022, 94% of Cypriots considered corruption to be widespread in the country.

== Extent ==
As of 2013, the government of Cyprus had, in theory, made some progress in fighting against corruption, for example, with the amendment to its Criminal Code in 2012, which provides the Criminal Law Convention on Corruption. The supposedly strong and independent judicial system is neither strong or independent. Nor is it competent enough to uphold most of the legal principles it supposedly has adopted, except for the protection of property rights. Critics would, however argue that this display of competency is due to the reason that foreign investors do not consider corruption a pressing issue for doing business in Cyprus. However, a whistleblower protection law is needed in the country in order to ensure an effective anti-corruption measure. It is also important to note that money laundering remains a serious problem in the country. In addition, corruption scandals involving politicians from major political parties are not uncommon and when these get uncovered, little to no effort is taken to pursue them. The usual “defense” employed by accused politicians, involves official statements indicating that “they know too much” and if their case is pursued, they will uncover dirt involving other political party members.

In Transparency International's 2025 Corruption Perceptions Index, which scored 182 countries on a scale from 0 ("highly corrupt") to 100 ("very clean"), Cyprus scored 55. When ranked by score, Cyprus ranked 49th among the countries in the Index, where the country ranked first is perceived to have the most honest public sector. For comparison with regional scores, the best score among Western European and European Union countries (Note: Austria, Belgium, Bulgaria, Croatia, Cyprus, Czechia, Denmark, Estonia, Finland, France, Germany, Greece, Hungary, Iceland, Ireland, Italy, Latvia, Lithuania, Luxembourg, Malta, Netherlands, Norway, Poland, Portugal, Romania, Slovakia, Slovenia, Spain, Sweden, Switzerland, and the United Kingdom.) was 89, the average score was 64 and the worst score was 40. For comparison with worldwide scores, the best score was 89 (ranked 1), the average score was 42, and the worst score was 9 (ranked 181, in a two-way tie). Transparency International's 2013 Global Corruption Barometer report shows that 72% of respondents believe that the level of corruption increased in Cyprus over the previous two years

As of 2022, 94% of Cypriots considered that corruption was widespread in the country. The so-called golden passport scheme allowed investors with a minimum of a 2 million EURO investment to get citizenship, a scandal which triggered an infringement procedure of the European Commission and which led to a gradual "phase out" of the program in November 2020. As of 2023, persons entrusted with top executive functions in government did not undergo an integrity check for possible conflicts of interest. Revolving doors is a problem in Cyprus, even though post-employment rules were adopted in 2007.

Since 2004, Cyprus has had two systems of financial reporting, one for the President, ministers and members of Parliament and one for publicly exposed persons, but the system is not working, data is vague and data collection is rare (only every 3 years). Also, as of 2023, information relating to spouses and children has not been published.

In November 2023, the International Consortium of Investigative Journalists, Paper Trail Media and 69 media partners including Distributed Denial of Secrets and the Organized Crime and Corruption Reporting Project (OCCRP) and more than 270 journalists in 55 countries and territories produced the 'Cyprus Confidential' report on the financial network which supports the regime of Vladimir Putin, mostly with connections to Cyprus, and showed Cyprus to have strong links with high-up figures in the Kremlin, some of whom have been sanctioned. Government officials, including Cyprus president Nikos Christodoulides and European lawmakers began responding to the investigation's findings in less than 24 hours, calling for reforms and launching probes.

=== Police corruption ===
Police corruption in Cyprus is unofficially monitored by the Independent Authority for the Investigation of Allegations and Complaints Against the Police. In 2013, the Authority heard a total of 145 complaints against the police by the public, from 132 complaints in 2012. However, there is no official, government-mandated authority to combat and monitor corruption, nor an official government anti-corruption strategy. Corruption within the Cyprus Police should be handled internally, as per the Cyprus Code of Police Ethics.

Corrupt activities among the police are typically defined as using a position of power to influence particular decisions, such as nepotism, the giving and taking of bribes, accessing information that is not directly related to an officer's current work or investigation(s), and lower levels of organised crime are also commonly noted in cases of police corruption.

A Eurobarometer Report by the European Commission in 2009 indicated that the grand majority of Cypriots (94%) believe that corruption is widespread in the police and the wider public affairs sector at national, regional, and local levels. A follow-up survey in 2012 indicated that 97% of Cypriots believed that corruption was a major issue for the country.

The 2009 report also showed that 89% of Cypriots believed that corruption was widespread within the Cyprian Police Service involving bribes and the abuse of positions of power (nepotism), compared to an average of 39% of European Union citizens believing corruption is widespread among their own police services or institutions. Additionally, 80% of Cyprian respondents to the Eurobarometer 2009 Report agreed that corruption is unavoidable within the public, police, and government sectors, whereas only 14% disagreed with the statement.

The 2013 Eurobarometer Report on Corruption indicated that the top three reasons for corruption occurring in Cyprus are: "because politicians and government are not doing enough to fight corruption (88%), the lack of real punishment (87%), and the lack of meritocracy (87%)". Oddly, 65% of Cypriots have reported having a strong level of confidence in the police in an unofficial 2013 survey comparing trust in the police across 50 countries. However, this disparity may be influenced by the continually changing perceptions of respondents based on recent experiences, or the political climate. Due to Cyprus's geographical composition as an island, corruption can spread across several networks, as high-ranking locals across several disciplines, such as politics, law enforcement, judicial officials, and businessmen, interact closely within the same social circles; whereas these relationships may be significantly diffused across larger mainland countries.

Transparency International (TI) has recommended that a Coordinating Body Against Corruption should be established under the Cyprian Attorney General, which is able to combat and enact strategic policies against corruption in the public and law enforcement sectors. Specifically, TI has recommended that an increase in police salaries, a reinforcement of the ethical code, and improved working conditions should be implemented to discourage the risk of accepting bribes to increase officers' own income. Additionally, a greater transparency in the disclosure of assets, or second jobs to supplement income, should be incorporated into the duties of high-ranking law enforcement officials, so that future conflicts of interest can be made aware of and monitored.
