= Sector 5 (Bucharest) =

Bucharest, Sector 5 Sector 5, București
- Sector
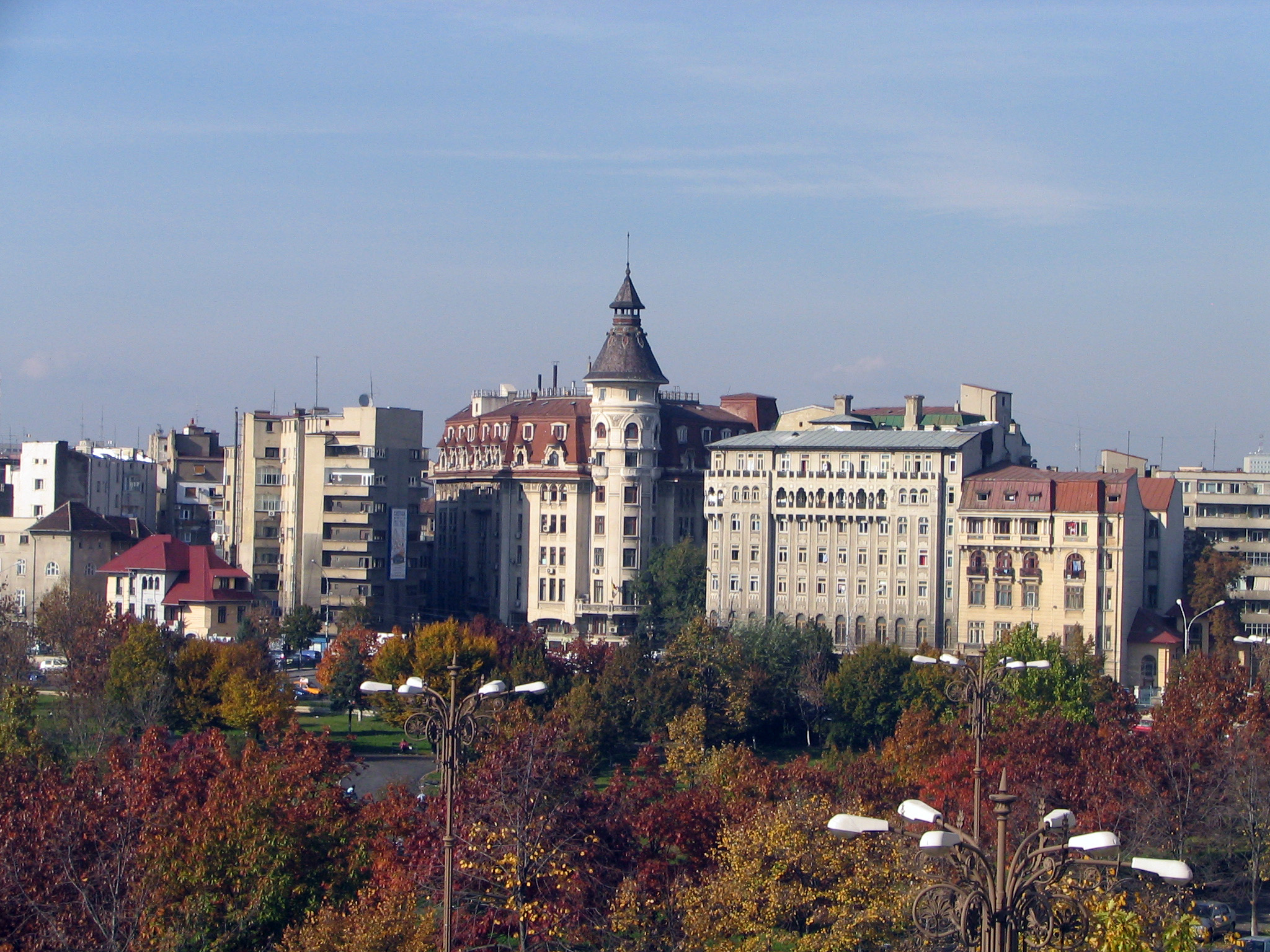
- Izvor from across the Dâmbovița River
- Interactive map of Bucharest, Sector 5
- Coordinates: 44°26′04.2″N 26°05′46.5″E
- Country: Romania
- County: Municipality of Bucharest

Government
  - Mayor: Vlad Popescu Piedone (PPU-SL)

Area
  - Total: 30 km^{2} (12 sq mi)
- Elevation: 60–90 m (200–300 ft)

Population (December 1, 2021)
  - Total: 239,607
  - Density: 7,986.9/km^{2} (20,686/sq mi)
- Time zone: UTC+2 (EET)
  - Summer (DST): UTC+3 (EEST)
- Postal Code: 05xxxx
- Area code: +40 x1
- Car Plates: B
- Website: sector5.ro

Sector 5 (Romanian: Sectorul 5) is an administrative unit of Bucharest.

== Quarters ==
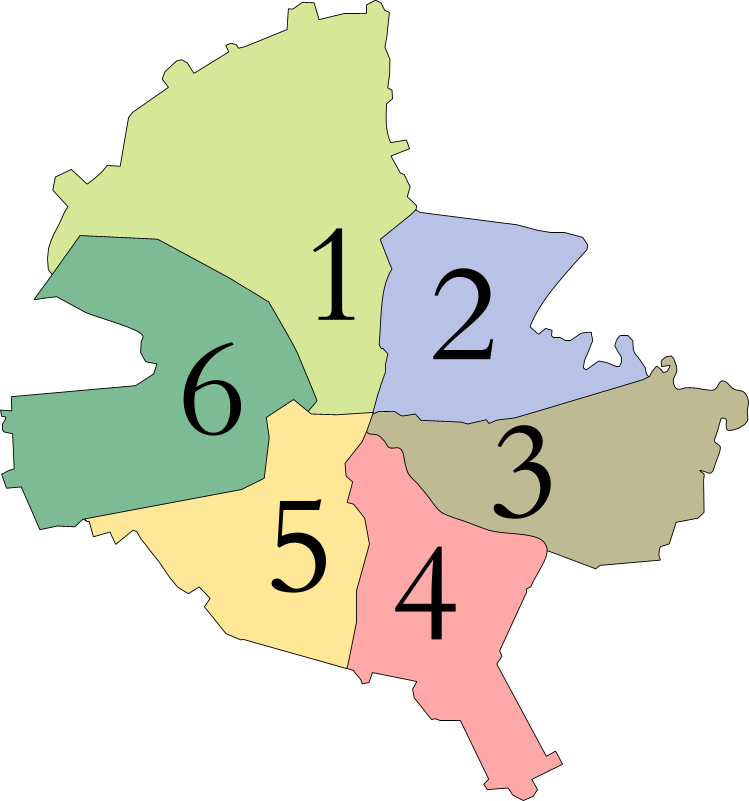
The six sectors of Bucharest

- 13 Septembrie
- Cotroceni
- Ferentari
- Ghencea
- Giurgiului
- Odăi
- Rahova
- Sălaj

== Politics ==
From 2020 until May 2022, the mayor of the sector was Cristian Popescu Piedone, a member of the Social Liberal Humanist Party (PUSL) and former mayor of Sector 4. He was elected in 2020 for a four-year term, defeating incumbent Daniel Florea, who had been mayor since 2016. In May 2022, vice-mayor Mircea Nicolaidis took over as interim mayor of Sector 5. In June 2023 he was released and came back in his office due to the fact he was never removed from this position. In 2024, his son, Vlad Popescu Piedone, succeeded him as mayor of Sector 5.

The Local Council of Sector 5 has 27 seats, with the following party composition (as of 2020):

Party	Seats	Current Council
Social Democratic Party (PSD)	10	
National Liberal Party (PNL)	6	
Save Romania Union (USR)	5	
Social Liberal Humanist Party (PUSL)	4	
People's Movement Party (PMP)	2	
