= Cristian Popescu Piedone =

Romanian politician

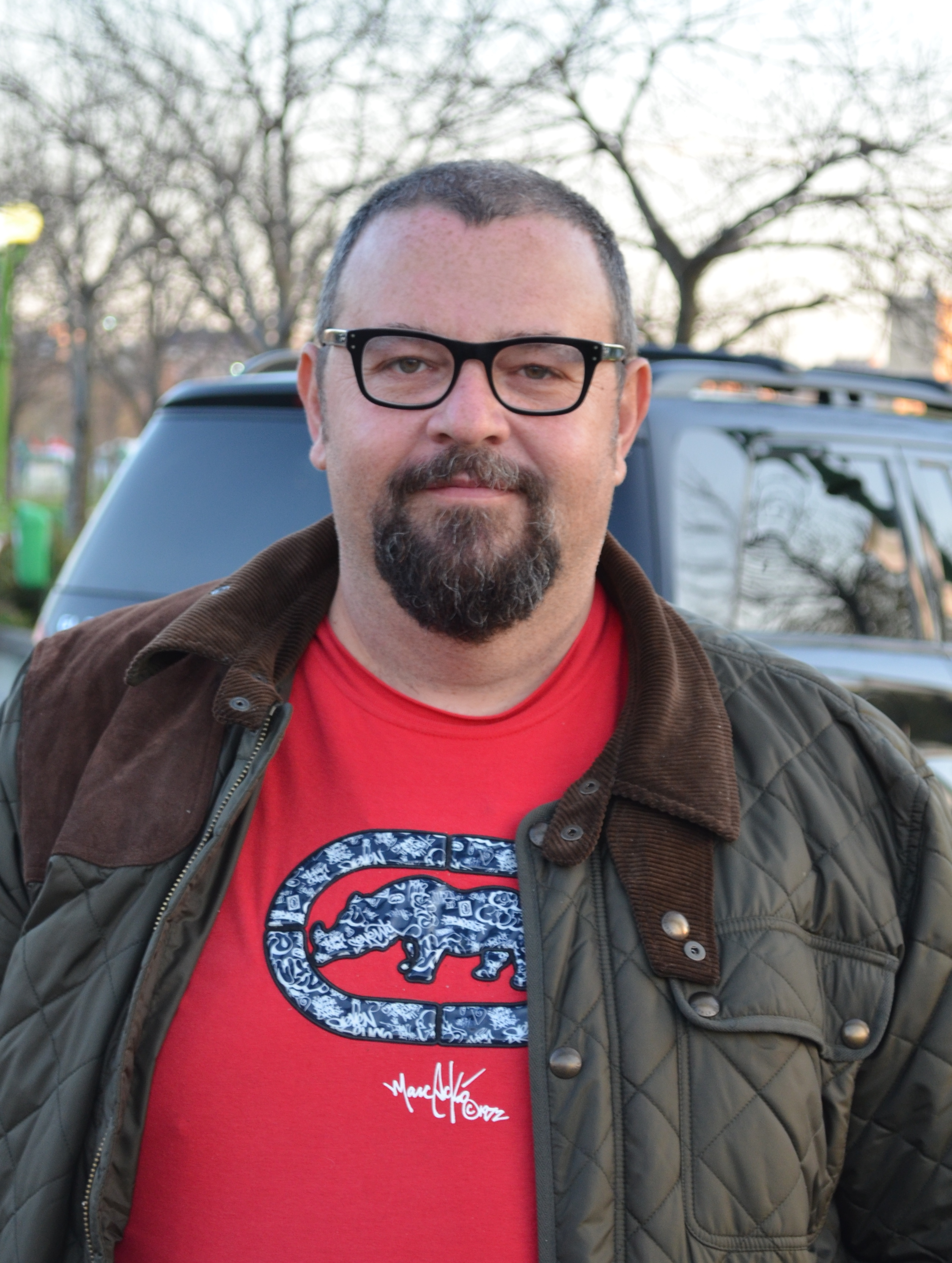

President of the National Authority for Consumer Protection
- In office 7 February 2025 – 23 July 2025

Mayor of Sector 5
- In office 27 October 2020 – 12 May 2022
- Preceded by: Daniel Florea
- Succeeded by: Mircea-Horațiu Nicolaidis (interim)
- In office 22 June 2023 – 30 October 2024
- Preceded by: Constantin Melnic (interim)
- Succeeded by: Vlad Popescu Piedone

Mayor of Sector 4
- In office 15 June 2008 – 4 November 2015
- Preceded by: Adrian Inimăroiu
- Succeeded by: Daniel Băluță

Personal details
- Born: 15 February 1963 (age 63) Bucharest, Romania
- Party: Romania's Reformation Nationalist Party (2025–present); Social Liberal Humanist Party (2015–2025)
- Children: Vlad Popescu and Ana Maria
- Education: University of Petroșani

Cristian Victor Popescu Piedone (born 15 February 1963) is a Romanian businessman and politician who served as mayor of Bucharest's Sector 4 from 2008 until 4 November 2015, when he resigned following the Colectiv nightclub fire and the subsequent 2015 Romanian protests and in 2020, he served as the mayor of Sector 5. He served as president of the National Authority for Consumer Protection from 7 February 2025 to 23 July 2025 following his dismissal by Romanian Prime Minister Ilie Bolojan.

== Biography ==
=== Early life ===
Piedone was born in Bucharest, but he spent his early years in Cairo, due to the fact that his parents were working at the Romanian Embassy in Egypt. He returned to Romania when he was 7 years old, in order to start going to school. He dropped out after he finished the 8th grade.

Marian Vanghelie declared that, in the 1980s, Piedone was the head of the House of Orders, which delivered food for the communist elite: the nomenklatura, party officials and Securitate officers. He also claimed that Piedone was caught by the police stealing and was arrested, threatening to commit suicide, so Vanghelie and Piedone's father intervened to have him set free.

Before the Romanian Revolution, Cristian Popescu was the head waiter at a seaside restaurant. In 1990, he opened his own restaurant named Restaurantul Ciocârlia ("Nightingale Restaurant") on the Dâmbovița River quay in Bucharest. Popescu joined the Party of Social Democracy in Romania (PDSR) in 1994 after the youth wing of the party started congregating in his restaurant. In a 2022 interview, former politician Miron Mitrea declared that Piedone was a member of the Party of Social Solidarity (founded and led by Mitrea himself), which merged with the PDSR in 1994.

He began studying at the Dimitre Gusti High School in Bucharest in 1991, at the age of 28, graduating four years later. He later continued his studies at the University of Petroșani, from where he graduated in 2002.

=== Local councilor ===
In 2000, he was elected a member of the General Council of Bucharest on the list of the Social Democratic Party (PSD), also becoming an inspector at the Sector 6 city hall. In 2004, he was elected councillor for Bucharest's Sector 6.

He subsequently quit the Social Democrats and joined the Alliance for Romania but returned to the Social Democrats in 2002, becoming leader of the Bucharest's branch of Young Social Democrats. He left PSD again in 2006 for the Christian Democratic National Peasants' Party (PNȚCD), then the National Democratic Bloc (BND), a small party created by trade unionists of Blocul Național Sindical ("National Union Bloc") and allied with Greater Romania Party (PRM) and finally joined the Conservative Party (PC).

Following the election of Bucharest Mayor Traian Băsescu as President of Romania, a by-election was held to replace the now-vacant function. Popescu was a candidate representing the National Democratic Bloc, gaining 37,985 votes, or 8.71%.

In 2007, he obtained his driving license in Pitești, Argeș County, after temporarily moving his residence to Priboieni. Following a fraud and corruption investigation, the authorities decided to cancel his driving license, together with hundreds of other licenses. Journalists noted that moving his domicile without resigning from his function as member of the local council is illegal. Additionally, while a resident in Priboieni, he registered a Cadillac in Bucharest, for which he was criminally prosecuted.

Popescu Piedone founded an NGO named Asociația pentru Protecția Cetățeanului ("Association for the Protection of the Citizen"), which drew criticism after receiving donations from the State Lottery, a state-owned company managed by a fellow Conservative Party member.

His assumed moniker, Piedone (Italian for "bigfoot"), is taken from an Italian movie character by that name starring Bud Spencer. In 2006, Popescu legally changed his name to include Piedone.

=== Mayor of Bucharest's sectors 4 and 5 ===
The Conservative Party's candidate for mayor in the 2008 election in Sector 4, Popescu Piedone won the elections against PDL's Radu Silaghi.

Before the 2012 Romanian local election, Popescu negotiated with the National Union for the Progress of Romania (UNPR) to be their candidate. He resigned on September 2011 from being the prime-vice-president of the Conservative Party and president of its Bucharest branch. In October 2012, he announced that he would run on the Conservative Party ticket, but the following month, he announced that he would run on the UNPR side. Romanian MP Elena Udrea announced that Popescu Piedone would be the coordinator of the UNPR–PDL campaign. A few months later, in March 2012, Piedone decided to run on a Social Liberal Union (USL) ticket.

Popescu Piedone was reelected in the June 2012 elections, gaining 80.36% of the votes in Sector 4.

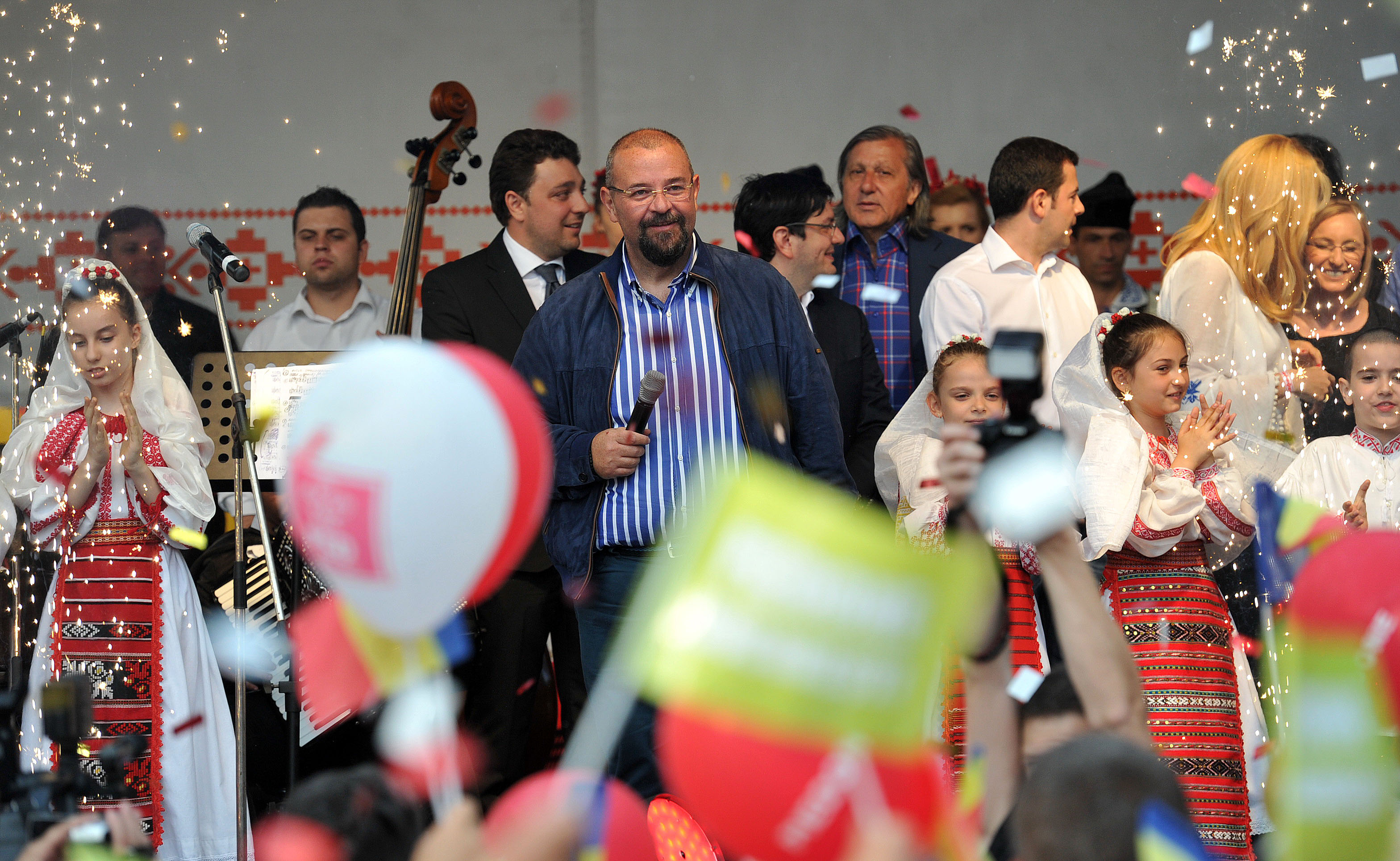
Piedone speaking at a rally in 2014

His Conservative Party merged with the Liberal Reformist Party (PLR) to form the Alliance of Liberals and Democrats (ALDE) and in July 2015, Popescu Piedone resigned from ALDE, joining UNPR, as he claimed to have "a beautiful friendship" with its leader, Gabriel Oprea. In September 2015, he announced that he would run again for Sector 4 mayorship from the National Union for the Progress of Romania (UNPR).

A criminal complaint by the Save Bucharest Association related to the demolition of a building belonging to a protected heritage area was admitted by the Sector 4 court, with Piedone being officially criminally charged in August 2015. The case involves a city house owned by the Samurcășești Monastery from outside Bucharest, which was demolished in order to be replaced by a 5-storey building constructed by the monastery in association with a real estate investor.

On 30 October 2015, the Colectiv nightclub fire killed dozens of people. Since the nightclub had been authorized by mayor Piedone, protesters demanded his resignation, which he handed in on 4 November.

The National Anticorruption Directorate began investigating the case, and they arrested Popescu Piedone on November 6 on charges of abuse of power for not respecting the fire safety laws when authorizing the nightclub.

In April 2016, Popescu Piedone registered as a candidate for the Sector 4 mayorship in the 2016 local elections, but his candidacy was contested by an association of the victims in the Colectiv nightclub fire. The judges of Bucharest Tribunal decided to disallow him from becoming a candidate. Following the 2020 local elections, Popescu Piedone was elected mayor of Sector 5.

In May 2022, the Bucharest Court of Appeal sentenced Popescu Piedone to 4 years of jail time for abuse of office in regard to the Colectiv nightclub fire trial. This also ended his term as mayor of Sector 5; Piedone was barred from public offices for an additional 5 years after the jail time. He was liberated in June 2023, after serving time at Jilava Prison. In 2024, Piedone rejoined the Social Democrats to run for an office in the Senate of Romania.

As a mayor, Piedone took strong social welfare measures, making him an important populist figure in local, as well as national politics.

== Electoral history ==
=== Mayor of Sector 4 ===
Election	Affiliation	First round			Second round		
Election	Affiliation	Votes	Percentage	Position	Votes	Percentage	Position
2008	PC	31,128	37.67%	1st	57,579	65.55%	1st
2012	USL	100,558	80.31%	1st			

=== Mayor of Sector 5 ===
Election	Affiliation	Main round		
Election	Affiliation	Votes	Percentage	Position
2020	PPU	N/A	27.25%	1st

=== Mayor of Bucharest ===
Election	Affiliation	Main round		
Election	Affiliation	Votes	Percentage	Position
2005	BND	37.965	8.71%	3rd
2024	PUSL	111.411	15.14%	3rd
