= EU Anti-Corruption Report =

The EU Anti-Corruption Report was the European Commission's short-lived anti-corruption reporting mechanism. The report was planned to be published on a bi-annual basis to monitor and assess the efforts of member states of the European Union in tackling corruption. The Anti-Corruption Report was established in June 2011, but discontinued in February 2017, having only ever published one report in 2014.

== Scope and objectives ==
The non-binding report was activated in 2013 as a monitoring mechanism to identify "failures and vulnerabilities across the 27 EU Member States". Specifically, its stated objectives were:

(a) to periodically assess the situation in the Union regarding the fight against corruption;

(b) to identify trends and best practices;

(c) to make general recommendations for adjusting EU policy on preventing and fighting corruption;

(d) to make tailor-made recommendations;

(e) to help Member States, civil society or other stakeholders identify shortcomings, raise awareness and provide training on anti-corruption.

The monitoring mechanism envisioned engagement with existing European and international initiatives, including the European Council's Group of States Against Corruption (GRECO); the UN Convention against Corruption (UNCAC); and the OECD Convention on Combating Bribery of Foreign Public Officials in International Business Transactions. Each Member State had a designated "research correspondent" working on the ground and reporting back to an expert group. The EU also aimed to draw upon the work carried out by existing agencies such as the European Anti-Fraud Office and EUROPOL.

== Discontinuation ==
In February 2017, the Report was discontinued. In an internal letter to the chair of the EU parliament's civil liberty committee, MEP Claude Moraes, Commission vice-president Frans Timmermans argued that the first and only Report published in 2014 had provided the basis for deepened work and consultations as part of the EU's anti-corruption framework. Subsequent reports were therefore not necessary.

== See also ==
- UN Convention against Corruption
- OECD Anti-Bribery Convention
