= FundRazr =

Canadian crowdfunding site

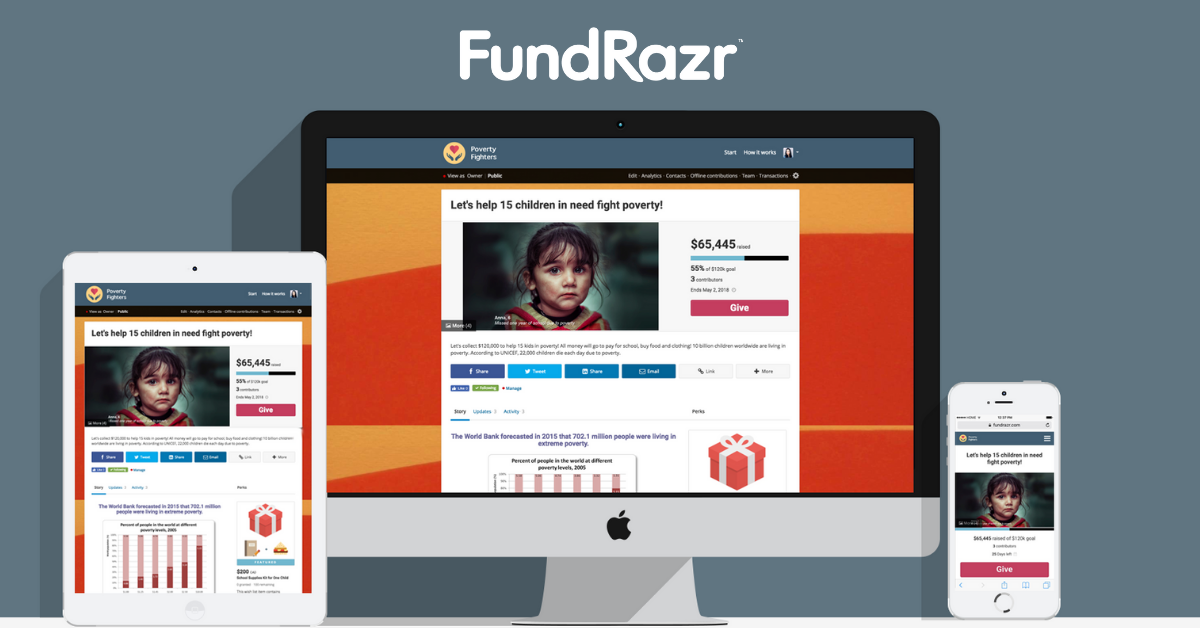
- FundRazr platform 2020
- Website type: Crowdfunding
- Available in: English
- Creator: Daryl Hatton
- Website: fundrazr.com
- Launched: 1 September 2009
- Current status: Active

FundRazr is a free crowdfunding and online fundraising platform released in 2009. FundRazr operates internationally in 35+ countries with the largest markets being United States, Canada, United Kingdom and Australia. It allows users to run a wide-range of crowdfunding campaigns by creating fundraising pages and sharing it via social media, messaging apps, email and more to raise money for over 100 types of causes such as nonprofit, medical care, education, community help, poverty alleviation, arts, memorials, and animal rescue causes. FundRazr also works with more than 4000 nonprofits, charities and social enterprises with an advanced fundraising toolset for free. The digital fundraising platform provides 8 different campaign types. They include microproject fundraising, peer-to-peer campaigns, wishlist campaigns, recurring donations, branded sponsorship campaigns, DIY projects, sweepstake campaigns, and storefront campaigns.

== History ==
FundRazr was founded in 2008 by Daryl Hatton. The head office is located in Vancouver, British Columbia, Canada. The platform was initially a Facebook app that allowed users to crowdfund money over Facebook. It has since developed into a full online fundraising tool set. FundRazr was the first crowdfunding platform to provide a collaborative community payment model, wherein funds are deposited directly to a company or cause—an example of which is their partnership with Heritage Education Funds to allow families to crowdfund directly to a Registered Educations Savings Plan (RESP).

In November 2015, FundRazr partnered with Place2Give to enable users to crowdfund directly for any registered charity in North America capable of issuing tax receipts directly from FundRazr using the GIVE_api. In 2018, FundRazr was modified into an enterprise crowdfunding platform and launched the Distribution Partnership Program.

== Business model ==
FundRazr uses the donation/perks crowdfunding model available for organizations, charities and personal causes with two pricing options: free (0% platform fee), standard (5% for advanced functionality) and pro (fee recovery models). A fee is not charged if no fund is raised. FundRazr allows users to create a campaign page for their cause. The page can then be shared through social media, email or embedded onto a third-party website to solicit donations from supporters. Supporters contribute to a cause through comments, shares, likes, and donations, which are all visible on Facebook. FundRazr is in partnership with PayPal which allow users to deposit and withdraw funding.

The fundraising platform provides two campaign options for users to raise money: Keep It All or All Or Nothing. Keep It All means all of the funds the campaign raised will be deposited into the user's account, giving the person immediate access to the capital. All Or Nothing means if the campaign does not meet the goal by the deadline, no money will be charged to the donors or given to the user. In other words, if the campaign does not raise enough to get the project off the ground, the user has the option to back out.

On 20 August 2013, FundRazr introduced "Crowdfunding as a Service" technology, which allows web publishers and companies to run crowdfunding service on their site. FundRazr subsequently announced its first official PoweredBy partner, HealthLine on 17 December 2013.

As of 2013, illness, medical and health-related causes represent 58% of money raised. Memorials/tributes represents another 12%. On 28 February 2013, Fundrazr announced that it had raised $20 million for its users. As of July 2018, FundRazr had raised over $116 million from over 140,000 campaigns.

In November 2020, FundRazr crossed $200 million total funds raised. As of April 2021, FundRazr officially launched fiscal sponsorship crowdfunding where all fiscally sponsored projects can raise unrestricted funds using the fiscal sponsor's 501c3 number.

== Awards ==
- 2013 BCTIA Technology Impact Award – Most Promising Start-up
- 2013 Vancouver Social Media Award – Best Social Media Campaign (non-profit)

== Reception ==
FundRazr is listed as the best overall alternative to Kickstarter in 2022. Along with competitors like Indiegogo and GoFundMe, FundRazr is also listed as one of the top major players in the crowdfunding market.

== Notable projects ==
Rank	Total raised	Project start	Project description
1	$2,371,889	August 2016	The Sacred Stone Legal Defense Fund raised over $2 million in 90 days to fund the legal defense for the #NODAPL protesters of the Dakota Access Oil Pipeline.
2	$1,278,999	October 2015	Researchers at the American Gut Project, the world's largest crowdsourced, crowdfunded science project, has raised more than $1 million from over 6,500 "citizen scientists" who have agreed to have their microbiomes sequenced.
3	$1,007,356	March 2012	Professional Gamer Athene's project Operation Sharecraft raises over $1 Million (including a matching grant of $500,000 from DC Entertainment) for East African Relief by Save the Children.
4	$414,869	July 2011	WikiLeaks Staff Legal Defence Team raises £233,650 as of 7 November 2013 for Wikileaks staff costs and Julian Assange's legal defence.
5	$256,740	October 2016	Water Protector Legal Collective partnered with the National Lawyers Guild to raise money for the #NoDAPL protests in North Dakota.
6	$181,346	November 2016	Over $181,000 raised in a peer-to-peer campaign by Aprons for Gloves Boxing Association to support Vancouver's Downtown East Side.
7	$110,536	November 2015	Over $110,000 raised for Peterborough Mosque that was attacked and burnt.
8	$107,742	November 2013	Over $100,000 raised for an Australian king hit victim.
9	$103,034	December 2013	Over $100,000 raised for father with incurable brain cancer
10	$103,014	August 2013	WikiLeaks Staff Legal Defence Team raises $63,969 as of 7 November 2013 for Edward Snowden's legal defence
11	$97,969	July 2013	Almost $90,000 raised for single mother who lost 3 limbs in a dog bite accident
12	$93,402	April 2012	Over $90,000 raised for Tiger Woods' foundation to send 10 deserving students to college
13	$59,778	October 2016	The Heiltsuk First Nation of Bella Bella raised nearly $60,000 to cover the costs of a diesel spill in their waters.
14	$30,544	October 2013	Over $30,000 raised for "good hearted boy", who used the money to pay off overdue lunch accounts in local elementary schools.
