= Colectiv nightclub fire =

2015 fire in Bucharest, Romania

- Romanian television stillframe showing the fire
- Date: 30 October 2015
- Time: 22:32–22:33 (EET)
- Duration: 2 minutes and 33 seconds
- Venue: Club Colectiv
- Location: Tăbăcarilor Street 7, Sector 4, Bucharest, Romania; 44°25′16.6″N 26°6′28.1″E
- Type: Fire, stampede
- Cause: Ignition of acoustic foam by use of pyrotechnics, fireworks accident
- Participants: 300–500
- Deaths: 64
- Injuries: 146
- Property damage: Interior of the club destroyed
- Suspects: 3 club owners, 2 ISU employees, Mayor Cristian Popescu Piedone and 2 public servants working in the Sector 4 administration
- Charges: Negligent homicide, negligent bodily harm and negligent destruction

On 30 October 2015, a nightclub fire which occurred in Bucharest, Romania, killed 64 people (26 on site, 38 in hospitals) and injured 146 others. The fire was caused by a fireworks accident and is the deadliest such incident in Romanian history. It occurred during a free concert performed by the metalcore band Goodbye to Gravity to celebrate the release of their new album, Mantras of War. The band's pyrotechnics, consisting of sparkler firework candles, ignited the club's flammable polyurethane acoustic foam, and the fire spread rapidly. Most of the victims were poisoned by toxins released from the burning foam. Overwhelmed by the high number of victims, Romanian authorities transferred some of the seriously injured to hospitals in Israel, the Netherlands, Belgium, Austria, the United Kingdom, Norway, Germany and France. Mass protests over the corruption linked to the fire led to the resignation of Prime Minister Victor Ponta.

In advance of the concert, the band announced that they would be including customised lighting, "pyrotechnic effects", and scenic elements brought in to "give life to the science fiction artwork" of the new album. The band's guitarists Vlad Țelea and Mihai Alexandru, as well as drummer Bogdan Lavinius and bassist Alex Pascu died. Vocalist Andrei Găluț was hospitalised with injuries.

The club's main shareholder and co-founder, Alin George Anastasescu, together with two other associates, Costin Mincu and Paul Cătălin Gancea, were arrested on 2 November for negligent homicide, negligent bodily harm, and negligent destruction. The club opened in May 2013 on the location of what was previously the Pionierul shoe factory, at Tăbăcarilor Street 7 in Sector 4 of Bucharest, within 3 km (2 mi) of the Palace of the Parliament.

Because it was a high-casualty nightclub fire caused by indoor usage of pyrotechnics, the disaster is similar to the 2001 Canecão Mineiro nightclub fire in Brazil; the 2003 Station nightclub fire in the United States; the 2004 República Cromañón nightclub fire in Argentina; the 2008 Wuwang Club fire in China; the 2009 Santika Club fire in Thailand (cause is disputed); the 2009 Lame Horse fire in Russia; the 2013 Kiss nightclub fire in Brazil; the 2025 Kočani nightclub fire in North Macedonia; and the 2026 Crans-Montana bar fire in Switzerland.

== Background ==
=== Club Colectiv ===
Club Colectiv was located on Tăbăcarilor Street 7 in Sector 4 of Bucharest and operated since May 2013 in a workshop for pieces of a former shoe factory Pionierul. The factory belonged to the Prodanof family, a well-known family of industrialists in the interwar period. Pionierul was one of the largest footwear manufacturers in Southeastern Europe. The establishment of communism meant its nationalization, and the fall of this regime in 1989 allowed the attempted recovery of the assets by family descendants. This approach failed, with the factory falling into the hands of former directors. Nowadays, the building belongs to Teamset Consulting, a firm based in Cyprus. The owners of Club Colectiv rented the location from Pionierul SA, for which Eugen Voicu signed as administrator engineer.

The shareholders of Colectiv Club SRL, the firm that owns the club, are Alin George Anastasescu – 47%, Paul Cătălin Gancea – 30% and Costin Mincu – 23%. At the time of the fire, none of the owners were in the club. A year earlier, Elephant Pub & Alive Music, one of the clubs in the old center of Bucharest where Costin Mincu has shares, had burned. Dozens of people narrowly escaped from losing their lives, and a firefighter was injured. Moreover, in 2010, Costin Mincu was part owner of Goblin Bar & Club in Vama Veche, also destroyed in a fire. Following investigations, firefighters determined that an unknown person had thrown fuel on the wooden terrace, and then set it on fire.

=== Goodbye to Gravity ===
Goodbye to Gravity was a metalcore band from Bucharest, founded in 2011. The band had five members: Andrei Găluț (vocals), Mihai Alexandru (guitar), Bogdan Enache (drums), Vlad Țelea (guitar) and Alex Pascu (bass).

On 29 October 2015, on Facebook, Goodbye to Gravity announced that they would be celebrating the release of their album Mantras of War with a free concert in Club Colectiv the following night. Doors were opened to the public at 8:30 pm. On this occasion, the band prepared a show with pyrotechnics and lights. During the fire, guitarists Mihai Alexandru and Vlad Țelea died. Bogdan Enache, the band's drummer, died on 8 November, shortly after the plane that transported him from the Burn Hospital to a clinic in Zürich, Switzerland, returned to Otopeni airport, because he had entered into cardiopulmonary arrest. Bassist Alex Pascu was hospitalized in serious condition with burns to 70% of the body at Floreasca Hospital, where he was intubated and underwent two surgeries. On 11 November he was transferred to a medical unit in France, but died at the airport in Paris. Vocalist Andrei Găluț suffered burns to 45% of the body surface (on hands, face and shoulder), burns of the respiratory tract and strong smoke poisoning. He was initially hospitalized in serious condition at Elias Hospital in Bucharest where he was tracheostomised and mechanically ventilated. On 7 November, he was transferred to the Netherlands, where he was admitted to the intensive care unit of Red Cross Hospital in Beverwijk.

== Fire ==
Candles and memorials in front of the former "Pionierul" factory, where Colectiv was located (video)

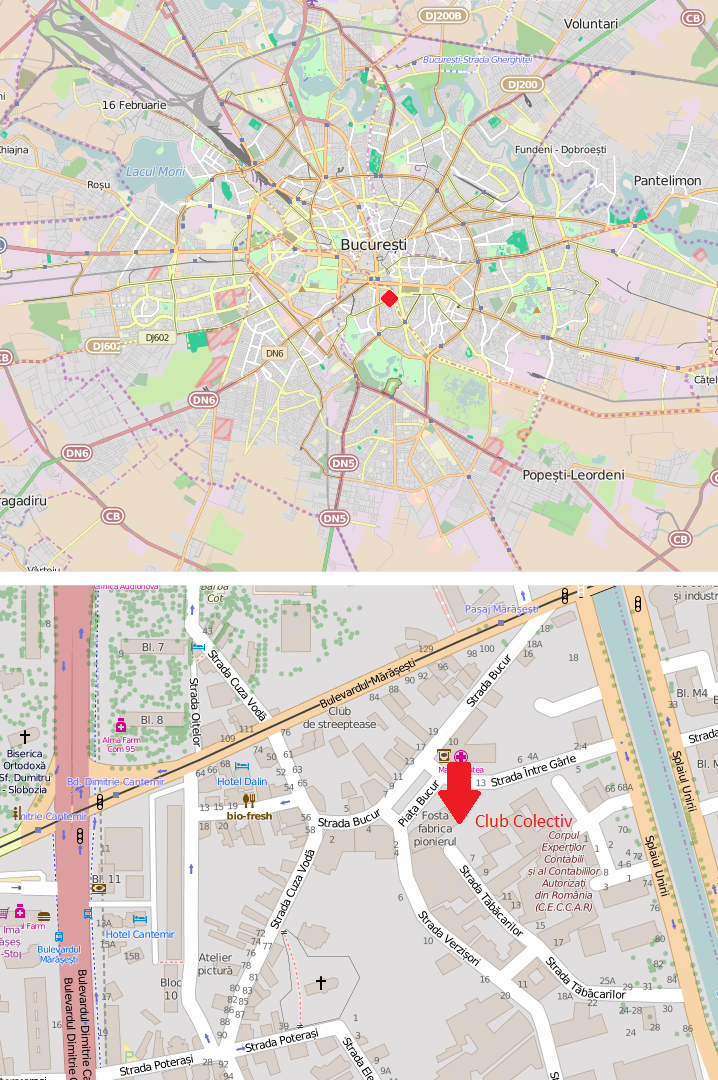
Location of Club Colectiv

Timeline of the event

30 October:

- 21:00 – The concert begins.
- 22:30 – During a song performed by Goodbye to Gravity, pyrotechnics are displayed. Sparks from two fireworks reach one of the pillars of technical scaffold and catch fire. A group of 50–90 people preventively leave the club.
- 22:32 – The first call to 112 is made. The fire spreads quickly from pillar to the ceiling covered with strips of pinewood and acoustic foam. The strips of incandescent wood collapse over those left inside. The crowd tramples, heading toward the only exit available.
- 22:40 – An agitated crowd of bewildered people, many with burns, leaves the Club Colectiv, screaming for help. Those less-affected run after taxis or cars. Hearing screams, medical staff from neighboring Bucur Maternity arrives at the scene to assist the wounded.
- 22:42 – First ambulances and fire engines arrive at the Club Colectiv.
- 23:30 – Police isolates a perimeter of several streets around the club building.
- 23:55 – Secretary of State Raed Arafat and Interior Minister Gabriel Oprea arrive at the scene.

31 October:

- 00:37 – Gabriel Oprea notifies President Klaus Iohannis about the tragedy.
- 01:55 – Health Minister Nicolae Bănicioiu calls for blood donations.
- 03:52 – The Prosecutor's Office attached to the High Court of Cassation and Justice opens a criminal file in Club Colectiv fire case.
- 07:13 – The National Committee for Emergency Situations is convoked.
All times are EET.

At about 10:30 pm, the club was engulfed in flames because of a spark set off by pyrotechnics. Some witnesses said there was an explosion, but this was disputed and later dismissed by other sources. The club's ceiling was supported by pillars, which were coated with a flammable soundproofing foam. Soon after the pyrotechnics began, the foam on one of the pillars was ignited. The fire spread rapidly to the ceiling, eventually causing it to collapse. Media reported that club-goers initially thought the flames were part of the show and did not immediately react. When the ceiling caught fire, the approximately 200 to 400 people in the club panicked and rushed to the only working exit door at the venue, creating a stampede. The two-part door was only half opened, thus too narrow, so people climbed on top of each other in order to get out. Many of the casualties suffered from leg injuries after being trampled. A witness said terrified concert-goers had to break down the other half of the door to escape, but many people had already suffered burns, or were in respiratory distress. People also smashed windows in order to escape.

The first to arrive on the scene were nurses and doctors from nearby Bucur Maternity Hospital who were on duty that Friday night. They heard the screams of the injured and went out to the street in robes and slippers to provide first aid. The first 112 call came at 10:32 pm, and the first emergency service arrived 11 minutes after the call. The State Secretary at the Ministry of Health, Raed Arafat, and deputy Prime Minister Gabriel Oprea arrived at the scene late in the night.

Survivors were rushed to hospitals in ambulances and some were driven by neighbors, passers-by, and a few taxis. Others were treated at a field hospital set up at the scene. A code red was declared, with off-duty doctors and nurses at nearby hospitals being called in to help deal with the emergency. Some of the unconscious were resuscitated by the light from fire trucks' headlights. Intervention crews worked with 75 special vehicles of the Inspectorate for Emergency Situations, including 11 with water and foam, and 57 SMURD trucks and ambulances. Around 500 emergency services personnel were mobilised – firefighters, gendarmes, police, and medical crews. Nearby residents housed concert-goers with less serious injuries overnight.

== Casualties ==
Nationality	Number of deaths	Number of injured
Romania	62	143
Turkey	1	
Italy	1	
Spain		2
Germany		1
Netherlands		1
Total	64	149

According to initial statements by State Secretary Raed Arafat, at least 27 people died from burns and smoke inhalation. Among the 27 people declared dead were the two guitarists, Vlad Țelea and Mihai Alexandru. Another 184 people were injured, most of them young, and of whom 146 required immediate hospitalization, including four foreigners: an Italian woman, two Spanish citizens, and a German man. Adrian Despot, leader of the band Vița de Vie, was also injured in the fire. As of Saturday morning, 17 of the 27 dead remained unidentified, given that most had no identity documents on them. By Sunday night, all the fatalities had been identified; however, 29 of the 146 hospitalized victims could not be identified due to the severity of their burns.

The injured were taken to 12 hospitals in Bucharest and Ilfov County, with the most at Floreasca Hospital (57), Burn Hospital (29), University Hospital (25), and Military Hospital (15). The band's bassist and vocalist were taken to Floreasca Hospital. Arafat acknowledged that due to the large number of victims in some hospitals there were no beds available, and the injured were redirected to other hospitals. Ventilation devices also had to be moved from hospitals where they were not being used, to those that needed more. Many residents of Bucharest reportedly flocked to blood donation centres in an effort to help the injured. Previously, health officials had launched an appeal to residents to donate blood. By the morning of 31 October, almost 600 people had donated blood at the Bucharest Transfusion Centre.

As of the evening of 31 October, 23 of 27 dead had been identified—14 men and 9 women. On the morning of 1 November, three more victims of the fire died, one at Burn Hospital, and two at Bagdasar-Arseni Hospital, bringing the death toll to 30. Arafat said the death toll could double, as 80–90 people remained in very serious, and critical condition. Two more victims died the following days.

On 7 November, nine patients (eight Romanians and an Italian—Neapolitan Tullia Ciotola) died, bringing the death toll to 41. Seven of them died at Burn, University and Floreasca hospitals in Bucharest, the other two after arriving or on the way to a hospital in Rotterdam. A further 14 patients were transferred with Army's Spartan aircraft to three hospitals in the Netherlands and the Erasmus Hospital in Brussels. The day was marked in Romanian media outlets as Black Saturday due to the number of people killed. During the morning of 8 November, three other wounded died, including a Turkish student—Ayberk Manci, the death toll rising to 44—12 deaths in just 24 hours. By 22 November, the death toll topped 60. Out of 39 injured transported to hospitals abroad, 12 died: four in United Kingdom, one in Israel, two in Netherlands, one en route to Switzerland, one in France and three in Germany. On 14 March 2016 another victim died at Floreasca Emergency Hospital, raising the death toll to 64. The victim was the last treated in a Romanian hospital. At least 13 of the victims that died in hospitals were killed by bacteria, probably because the disinfectant used was diluted by the manufacturer to save money.

One year and nine months after the fire, on 29 July 2017, a Colectiv survivor died by suicide. His girlfriend died because of the fumes caused by the fire on 30 October. One of those injured in the fire at the Colectiv club was Viorel Andrei Bud, winner of bronze and silver medals at the International Mathematical Olympiads in 2013 and 2014.

== Reactions ==
=== Domestic ===
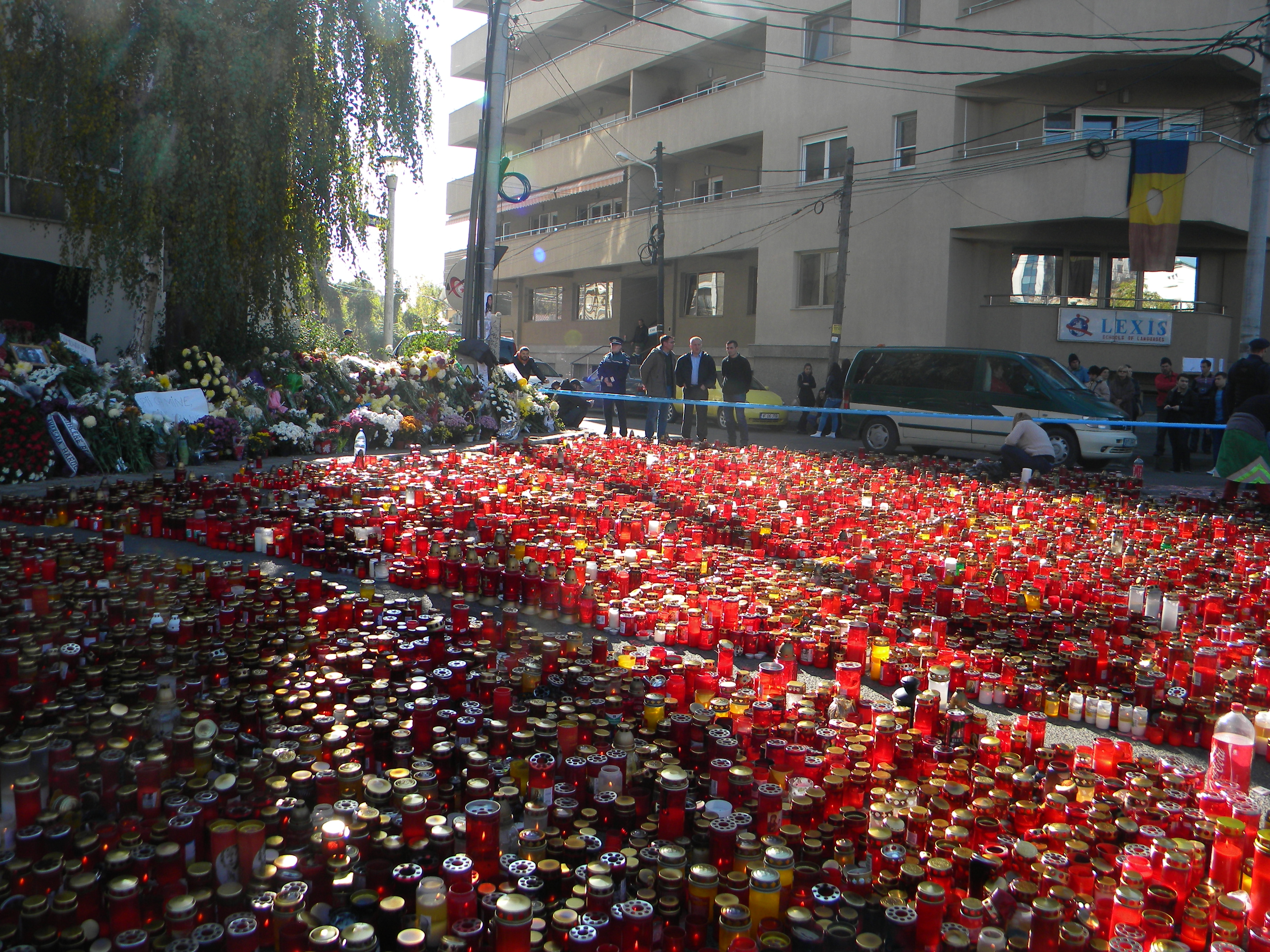
Flowers and candles outside Pionierul, the former factory where Colectiv was located

Romania's president, Klaus Iohannis, wrote on his Facebook page that he was "deeply grieved by the tragic events that happened this evening in the center of the Capital". He added: "It is a very sad day for all of us, for our nation and for me personally". He visited the scene, saying safety regulations seem to have been ignored. Prime Minister Victor Ponta said he was cutting short a visit to Mexico to return to Bucharest. On 31 October, the government decreed three days of national mourning, which was the first time in 15 years when three days of national mourning had been decreed in Romania. Halloween concerts and parties scheduled for that evening were cancelled across the country, and a campaign on Facebook urging people to avoid clubs and bars that night, and intended both to show respect to the victims and as a form of protest against inadequate safety precautions in such establishments, garnered over 100,000 supporters.

Former King Michael I said in a press release: "I am wholeheartedly with families grieving the loss of loved ones. My family and I pray for them all, as for the mourners, who have tears in their eyes today".

Following the fire, the Bucharest School Inspectorate suspended all dances organized by schools in city clubs. The Inspectorate is also requiring school principals in Bucharest to check the pubs and clubs where student parties and balls are to be organized.

Many artists canceled their concerts out of respect for the fire victims, including Delia, byron, and Luna Amară. On 1 November, 12,000 people gathered in Bucharest in a march of solidarity. Another 2,000 people gathered in front of the club to lay flowers and light candles. Similar commemorations took place in major cities across the country. Churches in the country held memorials for victims of the fire. In a national telethon organized by Intact Media Group, €1 million was raised in donations from viewers and companies, including Carrefour, Coca-Cola HBC AG and Rompetrol. Another fundraising campaign (Nouă ne pasă – "We Care") was organized by the Romanian Red Cross together with Pro TV and Vodafone Romania. On 4 November, more than 20 Romanian artists organized a charity concert, the profit being donated to victims of the Club Colectiv tragedy. Some artists include Connect-R, Delia, Carla's Dreams, Marius Moga, Dan Bittman, Voltaj, Andreea Bănică, Alina Eremia and Lora.

Two of the victims, Claudiu Petre and Adrian Rugină, were knighted to the National Order for Merit posthumously by President Iohannis for their efforts to save others in the fire.

Between 9 and 16 November, the Romanian General Inspectorate for Emergency Situations conducted more than 1,000 inspections at national level, in bars, venues, clubs, cinemas and malls. ISU released a statement saying they found over 3,200 violations, leading to the permanent closure and suspension of some businesses. Many of these businesses lacked correct fire permits or firefighting equipment and neglected to hold fire drills, the Inspectorate said. ISU also noted widespread violations of bans on illegal flames, pyrotechnics and public smoking—and doled out fines totaling 8.6 million lei, or US$2.07 million.

In February 2016, volunteer Pavel Popescu launched a crowdfunding campaign on FundRazr to cover medical expenses for the victims.

==== Protests ====
On 3 November, more than 15,000 people protested in front of Victoria Palace—the headquarters of the Romanian government—blocking traffic in Victory Square. Dubbed in the Romanian press the #Colectiv Revolution, the protests were held to demand the resignations of Prime Minister Victor Ponta, Minister Gabriel Oprea, and Cristian Popescu Piedone, the Mayor of Sector 4, who was criticized for giving an operating license to the club without a permit from the fire department. In front of the government building, large cordons of gendarmes prevented demonstrators from advancing toward the building. From Victory Square, protesters marched to the Interior Ministry, where they knelt and held a moment of silence. The protesters chanted "shame on you" and "assassins", and carried banners reading "corruption kills". By 10 pm local time, between 28,000 and 30,000 people (some estimates had more than 35,000) reached Constitution Square, with some protesters scaling the fences surrounding the Palace of the Parliament. Protests were also held in Brașov, Ploiești, Buzău and Iași. President Klaus Iohannis welcomed the street demonstrations, and cautioned that such events cannot be ignored by the political class.

Protesters also criticized the Romanian Orthodox Church and its leader, Patriarch Daniel 1, for their apparent lack of reaction in the aftermath of the club fire. Thousands of demonstrators marched on Dealul Mitropoliei in central Bucharest, where the seat of the Church is located.

On the morning of 4 November the Ponta government resigned. "I hope the government's resignation will satisfy the people who came out in the streets", Ponta said in a statement. Pressure had been mounting on Ponta for the previous month. In October 2015, he lost the Social Democratic Party leadership to Liviu Dragnea amid a tax fraud scandal, and became the country's first sitting premier to stand trial for corruption. One hour after the announcement of the government's resignation, Piedone also announced his resignation. He accepted his role in the tragedy, and expressed regret for his actions and inaction, stating: "It is a mistake and I undertake that I did not proceed to the resignation from the first day or second day after the accident".

On 4 November protests continued for a second consecutive night despite Ponta's resignation, with about 35,000 people in Bucharest, 10,000 in Timișoara, 5,000 in Craiova and Iași, 4,500 in Cluj-Napoca, 4,000 in Sibiu, 3,000 in Bacău, Constanța, Buzău and Galați, and 1,000 in Focșani. Demonstrators demanded early elections and a total change of the political class. Protests in solidarity with those in the country took place in London, Paris, and Madrid.

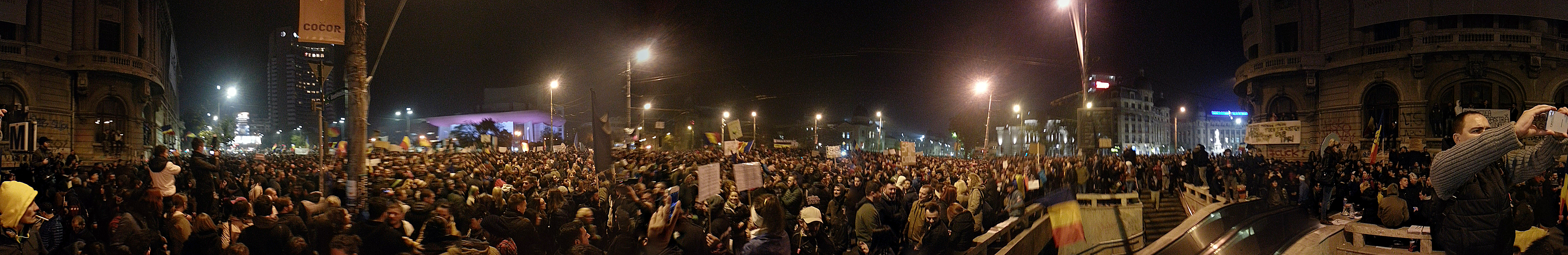
People protesting in University Square, Bucharest, on 5 November

On 5 November around 12,000 people protested in Bucharest and 10,000 in other big cities. For the first time the president invited representatives from street people to a round of consultations to hear their demands. After the Presidential Administration centralized 5,520 proposals, 20 people, mostly members of NGOs, were chosen to take part in consultations with Klaus Iohannis.

The next day, on 6 November, people kept protesting, although in fewer numbers (6,000 in Bucharest and several thousands in other cities). The president told the civil representatives that he will come incognito to talk to people in the streets, indirectly hinting that if they want true change they need to keep asking for it so the politicians can't pretend they don't understand what is asked of them.

On 8 November, in the seventh day of protests, Klaus Iohannis went to University Square, where he talked with some protesters and listened to their demands. While many expressed gladness at president's presence in the square, others booed, whistled and chanted "Shame on you", "Resignation", "Thieves" and "We don't want you".

The protest further triggered various civic activism movements in the following years, as well as several press investigations regarding the poor conditions in hospitals, forged disinfectants, poor institution communication and inadequate medical procedures.

=== International ===
- Belarus: President Alexander Lukashenko sent a message of condolences on 31 October to President Klaus Iohannis.
- Bulgaria: President Rosen Plevneliev sent a message of condoleances to the Romanian president, expressing his sadness after hearing about the tragic event.
- European Union: President of the European Commission, Jean-Claude Juncker, sent a message of condolence, saying that "on behalf of the European Commission I would like to express my heartfelt condolences to the families and friends of the victims of last night's tragic accident in a nightclub in Bucharest. I am greatly saddened to see so many young lives ending so tragically. My thoughts are with the grieving families and friends as well as with all those working hard in rescuing and in assisting the victims".
- France: The ambassador in Bucharest, François Saint-Paul, announced that a team of two French specialists, some of the best in the field, will arrive in Bucharest to help treat the victims of the blaze. He was at the site of the tragedy and expressed compassion for the tragedy victims and their families.
- Germany: The Embassy in Bucharest expressed, in a message on Facebook, their condolences to the families and friends who lost their loved ones in the tragic event. German doctors offered their help. On the initiative of a German fan of the band, the names of the deceased musicians were engraved on a microchip on board of the NASA InSight lander. People from 230 countries were registered including 8,000 from Romania.
- Hungary: President János Áder sent his condolences in a letter to Romanian President Klaus Iohannis.
- Israel: A team of plastic surgeons from Tel HaShomer Hospital near Tel Aviv came to Bucharest, volunteering to help treat the fire victims. One of the injured, Pro TV journalist Teodora Maftei, was transferred to a university hospital in Israel, where she received specialized care.
- Moldova: Interim Prime Minister Gheorghe Brega signed, on the morning of 31 October, a letter to Romanian Prime Minister Victor Ponta, expressing compassion following the tragedy. Likewise, Valeriu Streleț and Ion Sturza expressed compassion for the tragedy's proportions. The Moldovan Ministry of Health offered assistance and 2,150 units of blood. The week after the fire, interim PM Gheorghe Brega and Mayor of Chișinău Dorin Chirtoacă ordered controls in all clubs in the country and the capital, to check their preparation against fires. Interior Minister Oleg Balan assumed the responsibility for these controls to be carried out for two weeks.
- Poland: President Andrzej Duda paid his respects at the site of the tragedy on Monday 2 November, during an official visit to Romania.
- Russia: On 31 October 2015, The Embassy of the Russian Federation expressed regrets and condolences,
- Serbia: Prime Minister Aleksandar Vučić expressed in a message on Twitter "condolences to Romanian PM Victor Ponta and families who lost their loved ones in the explosion and fire at club in Bucharest".
- Slovakia: President Andrej Kiska said in a message on Twitter: "My deepest condolences to the families and the loved ones of the victims".
- Turkey: President Recep Tayyip Erdoğan and Prime Minister Ahmet Davutoğlu sent a message of condolences, stating that Turkey shares the pain and the grief of the Romanian "allied and friend" people. Turkish ambassador to Romania, Osman Koray Ertaş, went on 2 November to Club Colectiv, where he announced that a clinic in Turkey expressed readiness to assist victims of the tragedy.
- United Kingdom: A message of condolence was posted by Prime Minister David Cameron on Twitter, also noting the Sinai plane crash involving Russian citizens. On 9 December, in his first trip to Romania, David Cameron went to Club Colectiv where he placed a lit candle and a wreath of white lilies and roses at the site in memory of the victims.
- United States: The ambassador in Bucharest, Hans Klemm, paid a visit to the site of the fire and said he is "very saddened by the tragedy". He added that the incident bore "frightening" similarities to The Station nightclub fire in 2003.
- Vatican: Pope Francis has sent a telegram of condolences to President Klaus Iohannis through the Vatican Secretary of State, Cardinal Pietro Parolin. Pope Francis expressed his "deep sorrow for the tragic incident that took place in a nightclub in Bucharest, in which many young people lost their lives".

==== International aid ====
Immediately after the Club Colectiv tragedy, Romania could have requested assistance through the EU Civil Protection Mechanism. However, the request was only made six days after the fire. Thus, on November 5th the European Commission received a request from the Romanian Government to transfer about 80 patients who could not be treated in Romania to other member states of the European Union or the European Economic Area. Interim Prime Minister Sorin Cîmpeanu stated that Romania had not triggered the mechanism because the Club Colectiv tragedy had not fitted the formal definition of disasters.

On 8 November, 10 injured victims were transported by a NATO C-17 aircraft to clinics in the United Kingdom and Norway. Previously, two patients had been transferred to Vienna, and two others to Tel HaShomer Hospital in Tel Aviv. Likewise, the day before, 16 victims had been transported to hospitals in the Netherlands and Belgium. Two of them (a Romanian citizen and an Italian woman) died in Rotterdam. Some doctors came to Romania to see the patients before the transfer.

At the time of the 2016 Brussels bombings, the Queen Astrid Military Hospital was already treating numerous victims, many of whom had been under care for four to five months. The hospital wards were therefore fully occupied, requiring an emergency reorganisation. Patients were transferred to nearby hotels within a short time frame. Within approximately thirty minutes, rooms were cleared and cleaned for the incoming casualties. The Romanian patients initially misunderstood the situation and feared they were being discharged prematurely.

==== Musicians ====
Four days after the tragedy, German DJ Markus Schulz sent a public message on Facebook, announcing to his fans that he will no longer hold concerts accompanied by pyrotechnics, also expressing his sympathy for the victims and their families.

On 7 November Dutch composer and violinist André Rieu came to Bucharest and went to the site of the tragedy to pay his respects. Visibly affected by the event, he promised to donate money to the victims and write a song about the tragedy. Likewise, Spanish tenor José Carreras sent a message to the victims of the Club Colectiv fire, saying that he is praying "for all the souls that have left this world".

On 25 November, before their concert at Arenele Romane in Bucharest, the heavy metal band Sepultura saluted survivors from the Colectiv nightclub fire and expressed their regrets. They also donated to the victims.

On 11 December, after their concert in Bucharest, members of the Finnish rock band Nightwish visited several survivors of the nightclub fire at the Grigore Alexandrescu Hospital.

In 2016, to mark the anniversary of the fire, a compilation album entitled Back To Life – A Tribute To Goodbye To Gravity was released. Among the contributors were current and ex-members of My Dying Bride, Tristania, Mortiis, Eluveitie and Bucium (whose former drummer Adrian Rugină died in the fire). It also included the last recording of Goodbye to Gravity, a cover of Babylon Zoo's "Spaceman".

== Investigation ==
An investigation of the fire was started by the Prosecutor's Office attached to the High Court of Cassation and Justice. At the scene, the case prosecutor said that an in rem manslaughter investigation was in progress, and that the primary cause of the disaster was thought to be a fire, not an explosion. Hearings in the case began during the night of 30 October, when the organizer of the show was interviewed by the Bucharest Police.

A representative of the company who worked on soundproofing the walls of Club Colectiv—Luxory Media SRL—stated that the owners of the club had refused to buy fireproof soundproofing material, due to the high costs. The same representative said for Digi24:

Pinewood painted with washable hung from the ceiling. A month and a half ago, they took it off in order to wash the sponge on the ceiling. It was full of smoke. It doesn't wash. I hope they didn't wash it with solvent.

A team of specialists from the National Institute for Research and Development in Mine Safety and Protection to Explosion arrived in Bucharest to investigate the causes of the fire. According to the institute's General Director, George Artur Gaman, the club had only one exit—a door that was 80 centimetres (31 in) wide. The club was coated on the inside with foam that was used for soundproofing. The foam was extremely flammable. In addition, the club did not have fire sprinklers, or a way to shut off the electricity in an emergency. The club had only a single fire extinguisher, which would have been too small for such a fire. At the time of the fire, the 425-square-metre (4,570 sq ft) club had 300 to 500 people inside; Club Colectiv was only authorized for 80 seats.

On 2 November, prosecutors charged the club's owners—Alin Anastasescu, Paul Gancea, and Costin Mincu—with negligent homicide and negligent bodily harm, and detained them after a 10-hour hearing. As of 5 November, 70 people have been heard so far in the Colectiv fire case. Many came on their own initiative to file a complaint and be a civil party. The former mayor of Sector 4, Cristian Popescu Piedone, is also being targeted in the case, being investigated for abuse of office and forgery concerning the authorization of Club Colectiv. On 6 November, he was detained by DNA prosecutors for 24 hours.

Director of Golden Ideas Fireworks Artists SRL, Cristian Niță, and others employed in this company that provided pyrotechnic effects in Club Colectiv were intercepted while discussing the destruction of evidence. According to intercepted communications, one of the company's employees contacted director Cristian Niță the day after the fire, asking him to remove a number of relevant documents from the computer. Cristian Niță, his wife, Daniela and Viorel Zaharia, authorized pyrotechnist and company employee were detained by prosecutors. Andreea Sârbu, employee of Golden Ideas Fireworks Artists SRL, told investigators that there was no contract between the firm she works and Digidream [Goodbye to Gravity band] for the fireworks in the club, but it was subsequently written by emergency.

To my knowledge, Niță Daniela Ioana talked with Adrian Rugină [Digidream representative] on Thursday evening, 29 October 2015, to meet on Saturday to sign the contract. Effectively, there was no contract between our firm and Digidream for fireworks on the evening of 30 October 2015. It was drafted by emergency on 31 October 2015.

— Andreea Sârbu, in the face of investigators

Investigators found in the club a partly burned document that supports the version of events where on the evening of 30 October, patrons had rented the club to the band Goodbye to Gravity. The rental agreement stipulated that Goodbye to Gravity had to pay a rent of €500 should they fail to gather a crowd of at least 400, in which case the consumption from the bar would have been sufficient to cover the costs.

ISU Bucharest-Ilfov heads—chief inspector colonel Mihai Mirel Guță, first adjunct Orlando Șchiopu and adjunct Giani Aldoiu—were suspended from office after journalist Cătălin Tolontan published a document on his blog, alleging that event organizer Emagic informed the General Inspectorate for Emergency Situations (IGSU) about organizing a show on 25 September, in Club Colectiv. IGSU submitted the request to ISU Bucharest, who did not verify the situation immediately and took no action against the club for operating illegally. A month later, the Colectiv Club fire took place, resulting in 60 deaths and dozens of injuries. The newly appointed prime minister, Dacian Cioloș, reacted: "ISU Bucharest leadership must be dismissed, they no longer belong to the system". On 25 November, Guță, Șchiopu and Aldoiu were heard at the National Anticorruption Directorate.

Prosecutor General's technical juridical expertise, released three months after the fire, revealed that no control of Sector 4's City Hall took place in five years. Moreover, use of non-compliant, inflammable materials, lack of emergency exits and construction deficiencies hampering evacuation (the verge was higher by 7 cm [2.8 in]) were among the main causes of the tragedy.

== In popular culture ==
"Moment of Silence", the song with which Ovidiu Anton was supposed to represent Romania at the Eurovision Song Contest 2016, was written in the wake of #Colectiv protests. "It's a song for all the people who should remember once again that we are the only ones in control of our lives, no one has the right to use our souls to get obscure interests", said Ovidiu, alluding to the events leading to the fire.

The band Aquila used audio of the victims' screams in a song that was meant to be a tribute to those who died there. YouTube users called for its removal from the site, claiming "total lack of respect".

The feature documentary Collective (2019) by Alexander Nanau told the story of the aftermath of the fire and scandals involving corruption in the health system of Romania that affected the treatment of the burns victims of the fire.

== Gallery ==
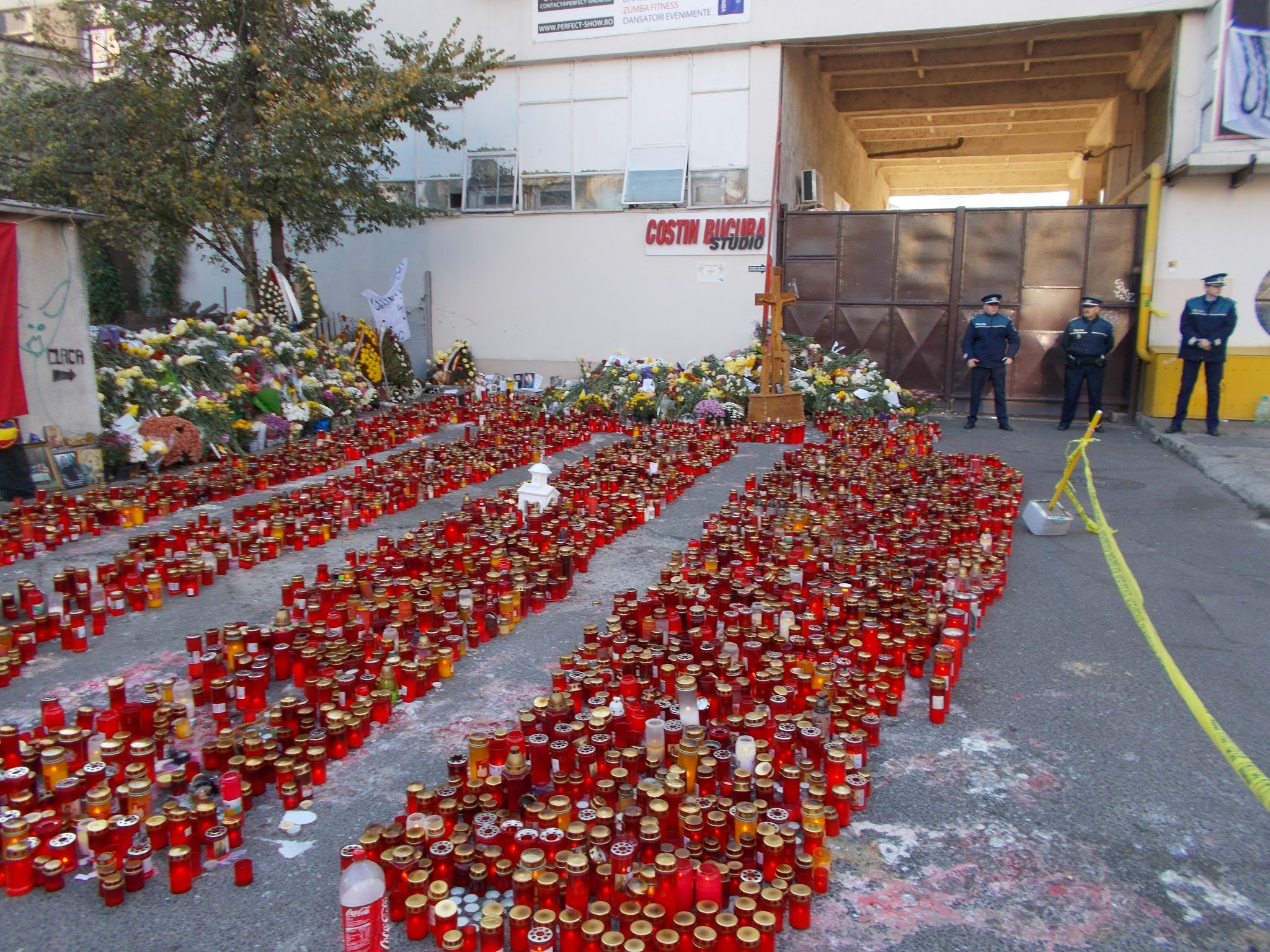
Main entrance of the former factory, guarded by policemen

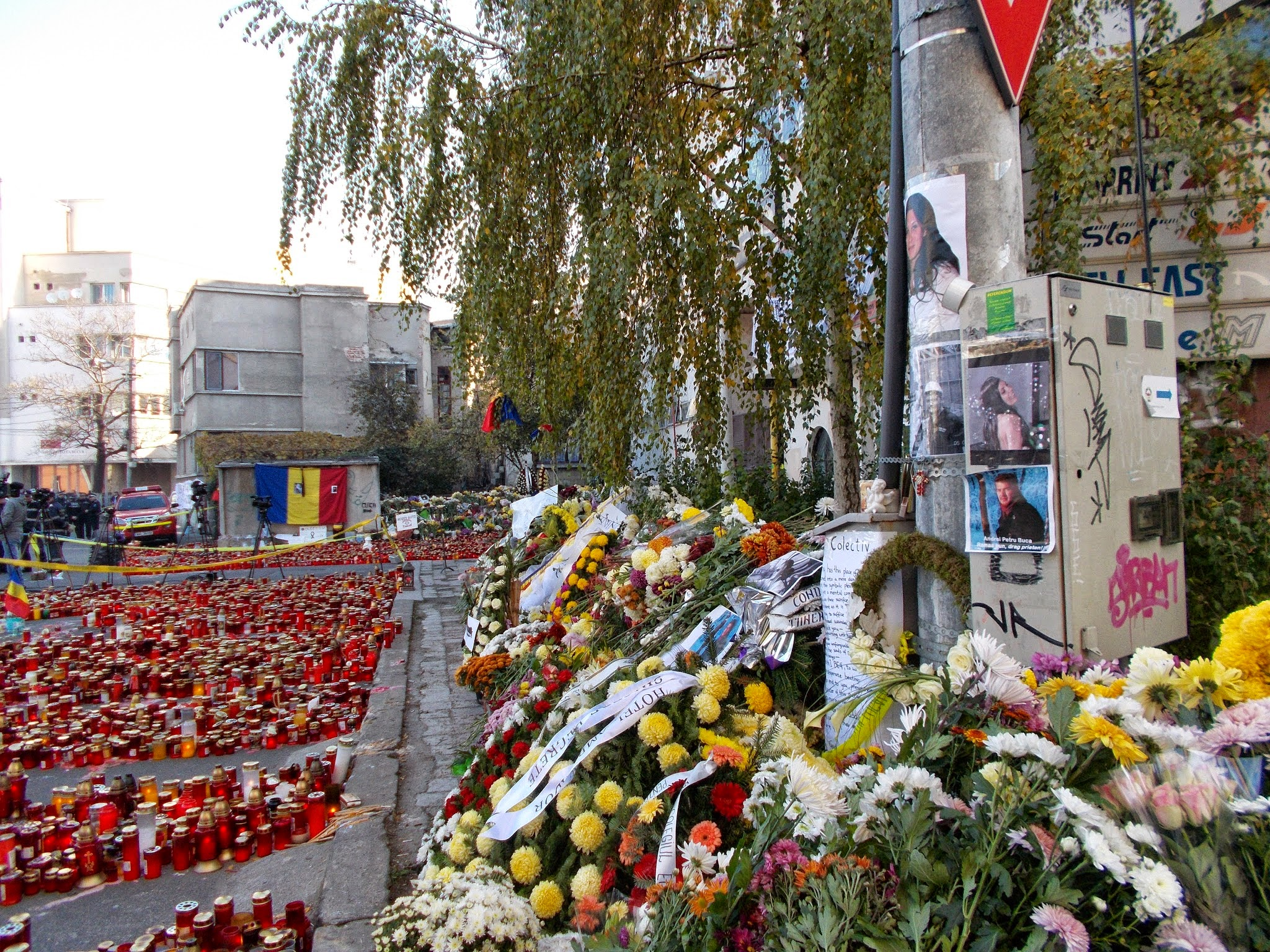
Candles and wreaths at the site of Club Colectiv

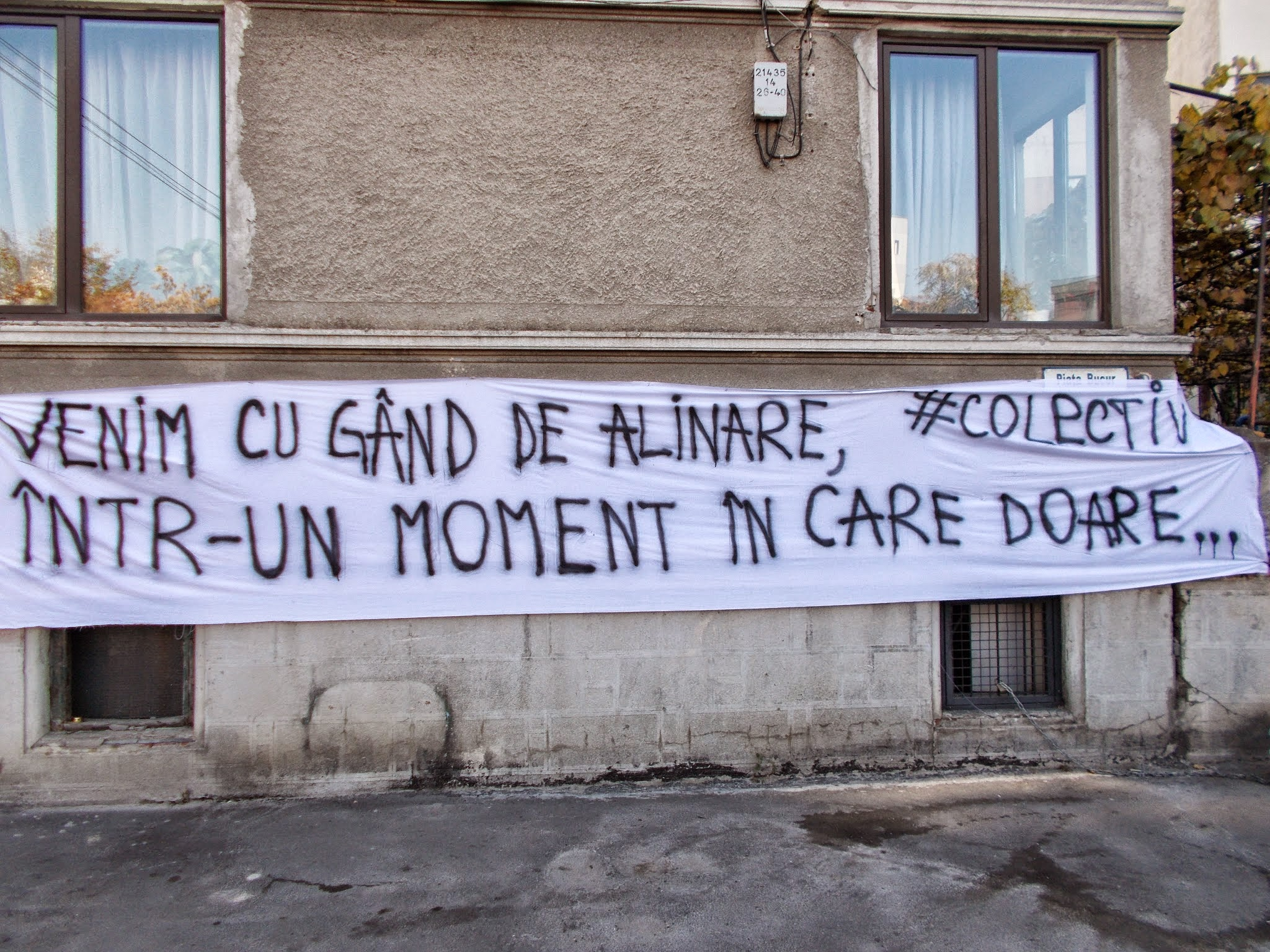
Banner reading: "We come with thought of comfort, in a moment that hurts..."

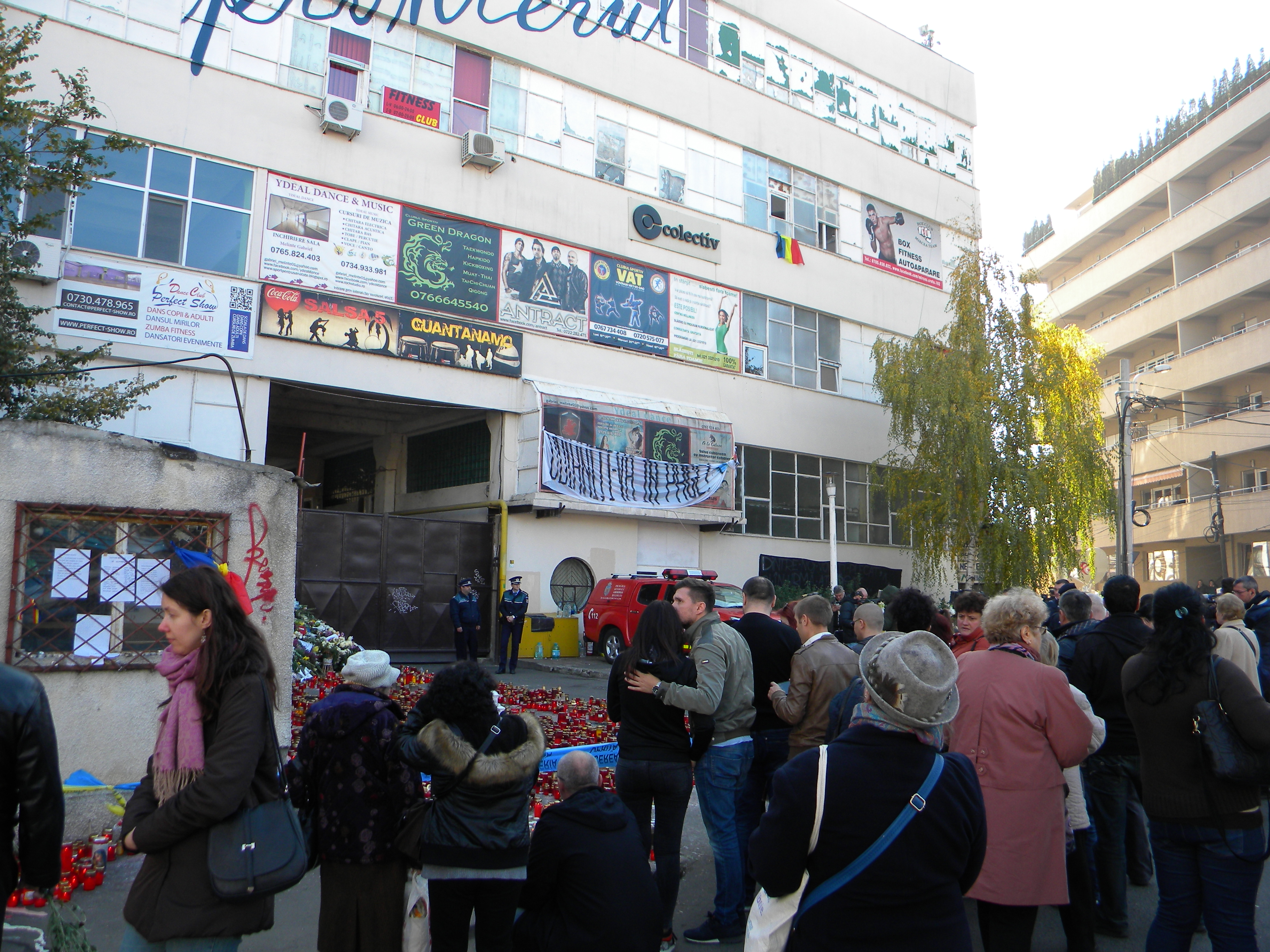
People mourning victims in front of the factory

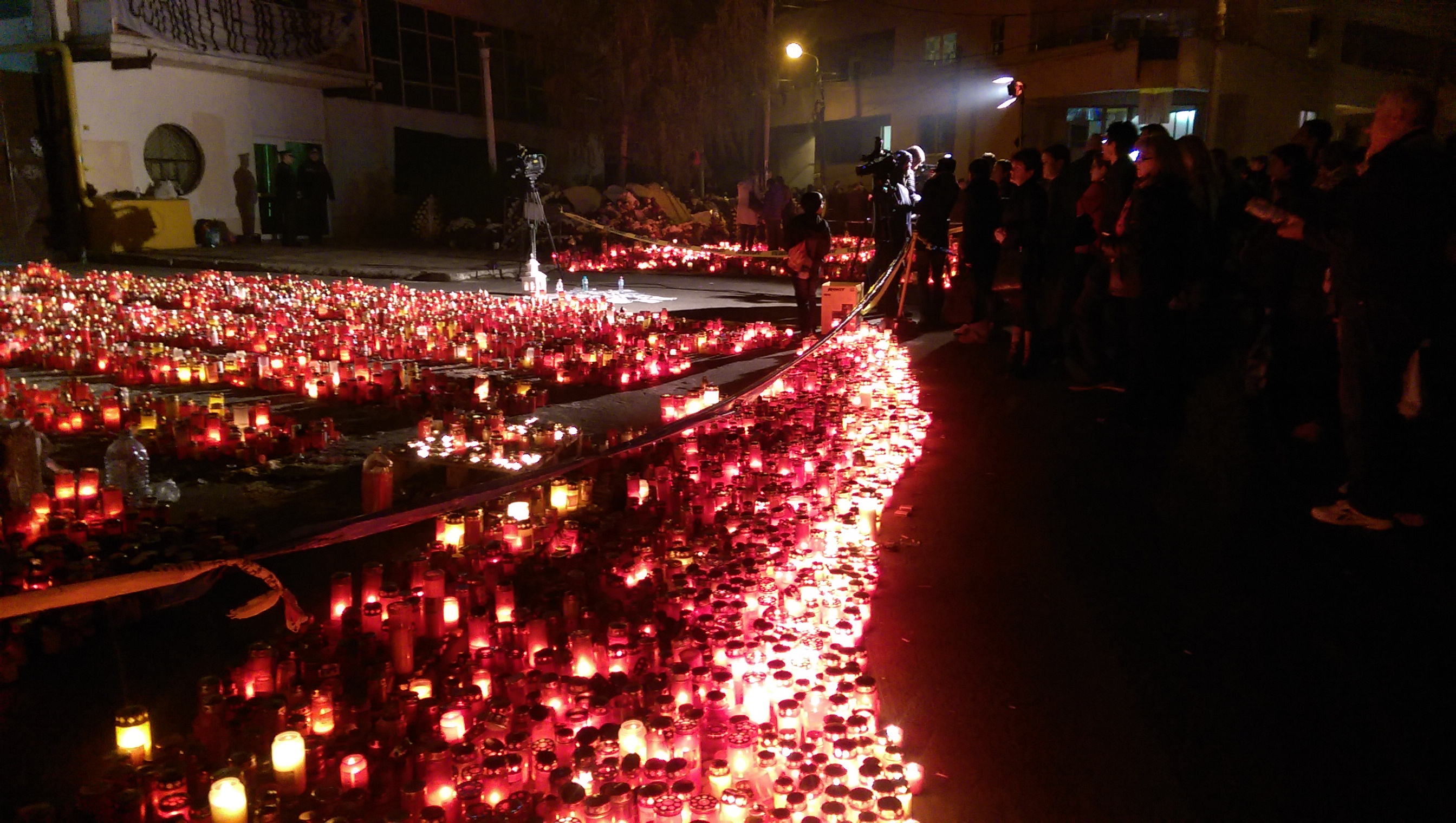
Candles and wreaths at the site of Club Colectiv

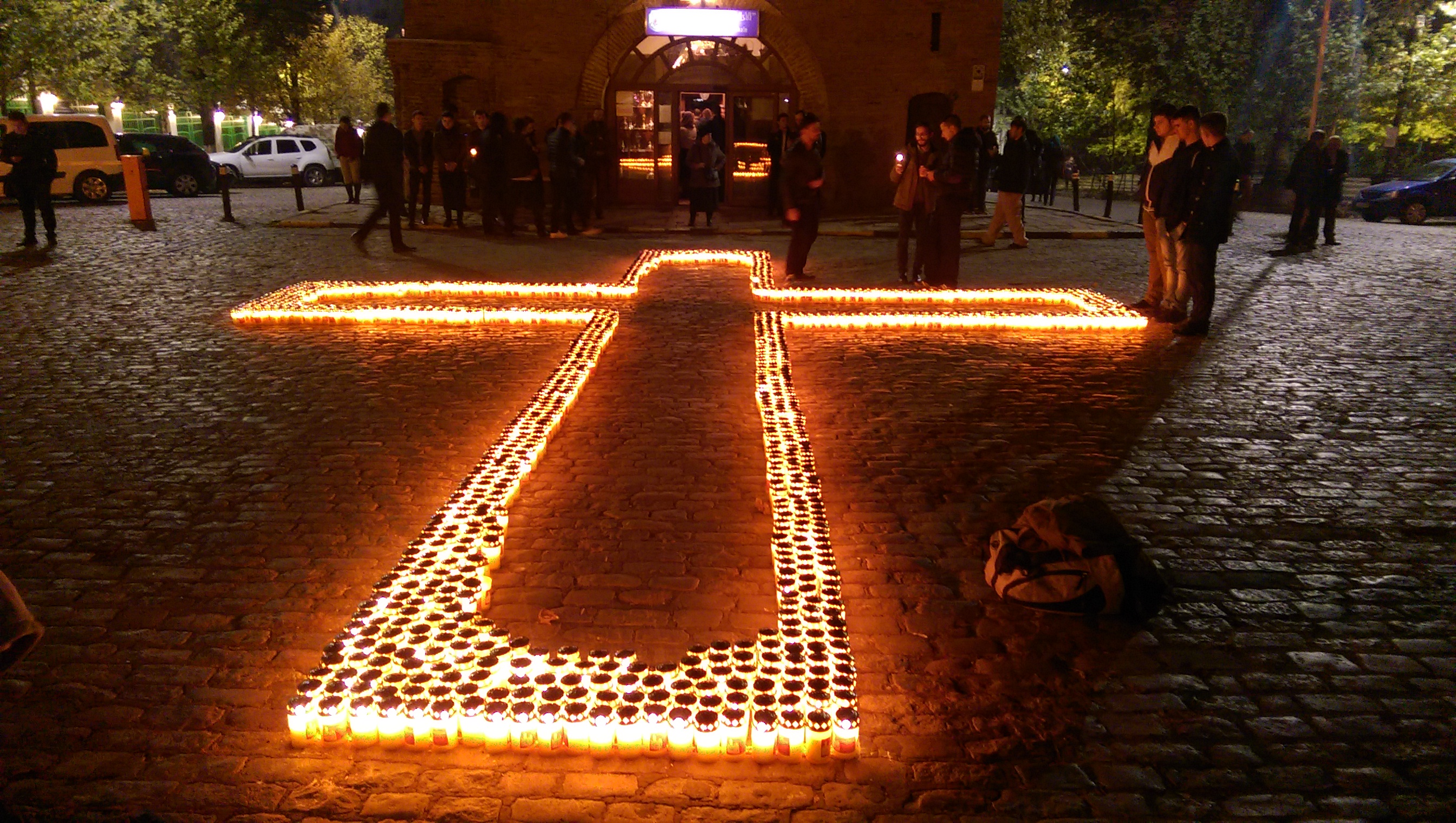
Service for the victims, 5 November 2015

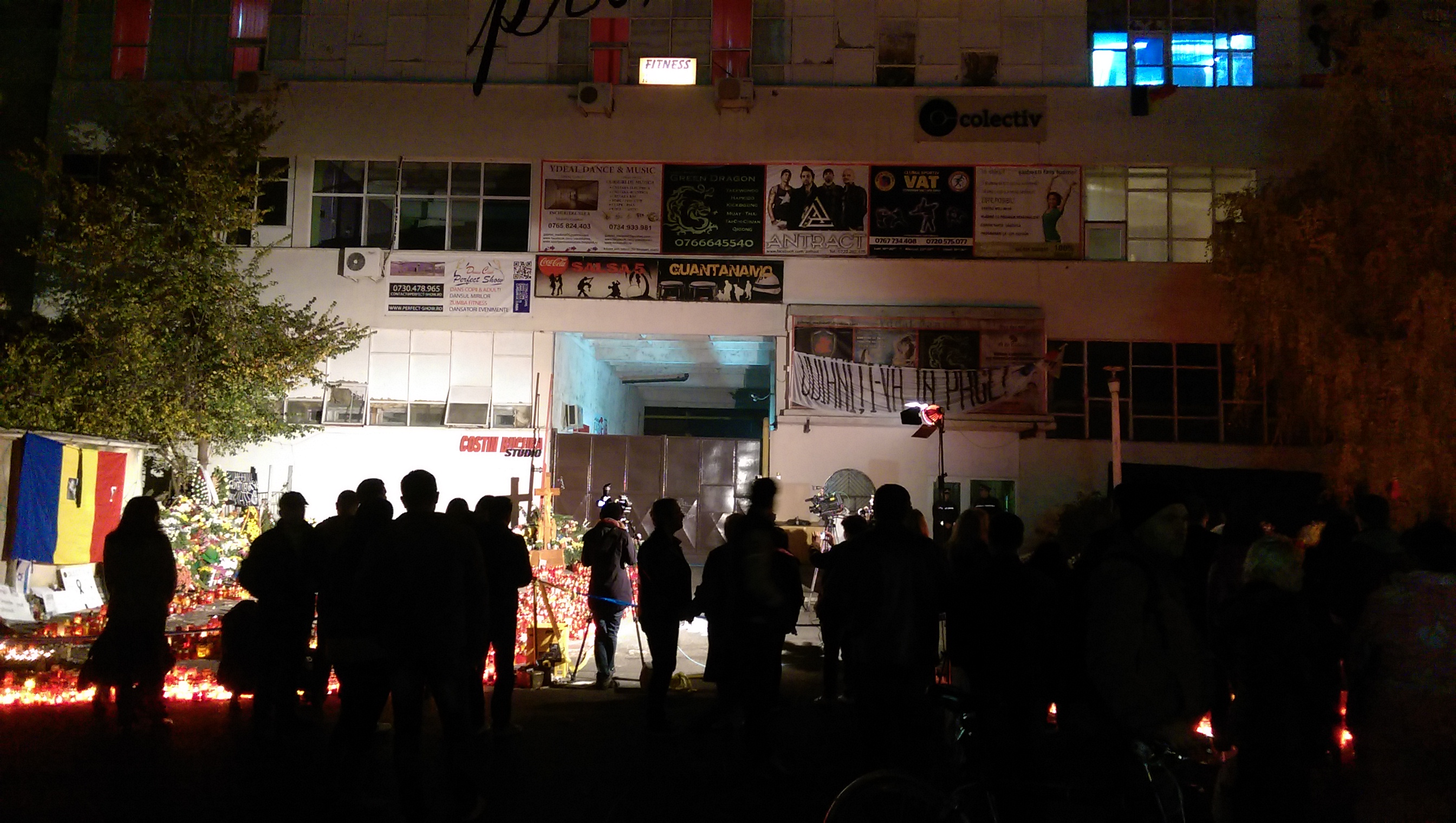
Outside the factory in which Club Colectiv was located, night of 5 November 2015

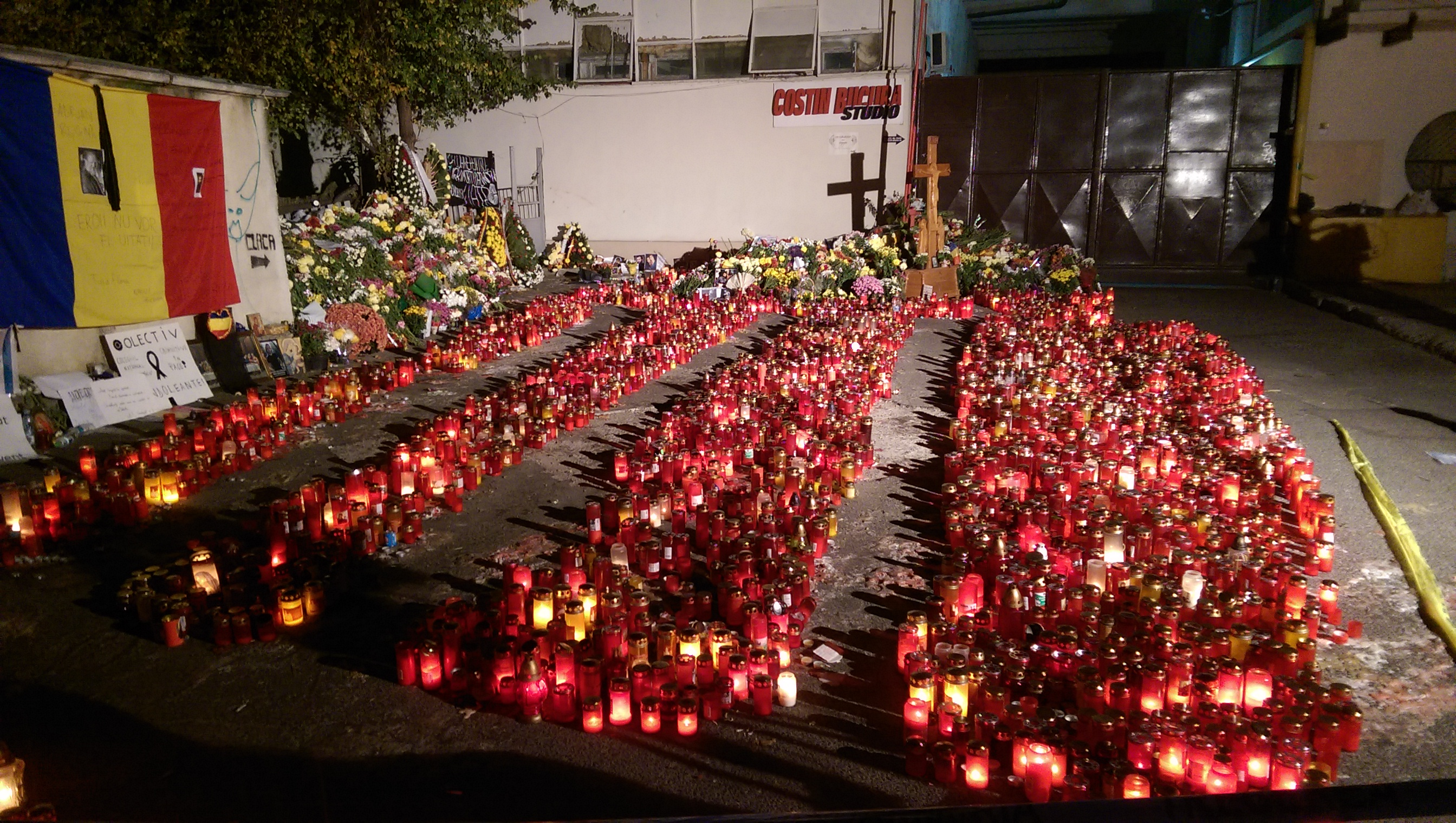
Candles and wreaths at the site of Club Colectiv

== See also ==
- 1930 Costești wooden church fire
- List of fireworks accidents and incidents
- The Station nightclub fire, 2003 United States nightclub fire that involved a band using on-stage pyrotechnics
- Ghost Ship warehouse fire, 2016 fire also at a nightclub in an industrial building
- Kočani nightclub fire, 2025 nightclub fire that involved a band using on-stage pyrotechnics
- Kiss nightclub fire, 2012 Brazilian nightclub fire that involved a band using on-stage pyrotechnics
