= Vlad Popescu =

Romanian politician

Vlad Popescu Piedone (born September 16, 1989) is a Romanian politician who served as deputy from the PSD during 2020–2024. In 2024, he was elected mayor of Sector 5 of Bucharest.

Born in Bucharest, he graduated from the Law School of Titu Maiorescu University in 2012. He is married and has two children; he is the son of Cristian Popescu Piedone.
