= List of disasters in Thailand =

Many disasters have occurred in Thailand, leading to loss of life and economic damages. Most natural disasters that have happened in the country are storm- and flood-related, while man-made disasters have also caused great losses. This page lists by date accidents and disasters which have caused significant losses or been the focus of national public attention, grouped into natural and man-made disasters.

== Natural disasters ==
- 25–26 October 1962: Tropical Storm Harriet made landfall in Nakhon Si Thammarat Province, causing a storm surge that wiped out villages in Laem Talumphuk, Pak Phanang District, killing over 900 and leaving over 10,000 people homeless.
- 22 November 1988: Landslides in Ban Kathun Nuea, Phipun District and Ban Khiri Wong, Lan Saka District in Nakhon Si Thammarat resulted in 230 deaths or injuries, and 12 deaths, respectively, and damages worth 1 billion baht.
- 1–4 November 1989: Typhoon Gay struck the coast of Chumphon Province, resulting in 833 deaths and 11.7 billion baht in damages.
- 4 October 1990: Tropical Storm Ira passed over Ubon Ratchathani Province, triggering severe flooding which killed at least 24 people, damaged 4.1 million rai (6,600 square kilometres (2,500 sq mi)) of farmland, and resulted in 6 million baht in damages.
- 29 November 1993: A tropical depression caused flooding in Nakhon Si Thammarat Province resulting in 23 deaths and 1.3 billion baht in damages.
- 23–24 August 1997: Flooding in Northern Thailand triggered by Tropical Storm Zita caused 49 deaths and 2.9 billion baht in damages.
- 3 November 1997: Tropical Storm Linda passed over Nakhon Si Thammarat killing at least 164, mostly at sea.
- 20–22 November 2000: Flooding in Songkhla Province, especially in Hat Yai, resulted in 26 deaths and 2 billion baht in damages.
- 4 May 2001: A landslide in Wang Chin District, Phrae, resulted in 43 deaths.
- 11 August 2001: A landslide in Nam Ko Subdistrict, Lom Sak District, Phetchabun, killed 136 and injured 109.
- 26 December 2004: The Indian Ocean tsunami hit the west coast of Southern Thailand, resulting in 4,812 confirmed deaths, 8,458 injuries, and 4,499 missing in Thailand.
- 23 May 2006: Heavy rainfall caused flash flooding and landslides in Uttaradit, Sukhothai, Phrae, Lampang and Nan Provinces, resulting in 87 deaths.
- 2 October 2006: Remnants of Typhoon Xangsane passed over Thailand, killing 47 and damaging 1.3 million rai (2,100 square kilometres (810 sq mi)) of farmland and local infrastructure.
- October–December 2010: Flooding in multiple regions resulted in 80 deaths in Southern Thailand and 180 deaths in upper parts of the country. Damages were estimated at up to 54 billion baht.
- July 2011 – January 2012: widespread flooding in 65 provinces resulted in 815 confirmed deaths, 13 million rai (21,000 square kilometres (8,100 sq mi) of farmland damaged, and estimated economic losses of 1,425 billion baht.
- 5 May 2014: A magnitude-6.1 earthquake in Chiang Rai's Mae Lao District, the strongest ever recorded in Thailand, results in 2 deaths and 23 injuries.
- 28 March 2025: Effects of a magnitude-7.7 earthquake in Myanmar causes damage in eighteen provinces, especially to skyscrapers in Bangkok, and 99 confirmed and 4 presumed deaths, including 96 among construction workers caught in the collapse of the State Audit Office building.
- 25 November 2025: Cyclone Senyar causing extreme rainfall and triggered deadly floods. At least 297 deaths were recorded, with 200 fatalities alone in Songkhla province.

== Man-made disasters ==
- 19 July 1962: United Arab Airlines Flight 869 crashed in Khao Yai on approach to Bangkok, killing all 26 on board.
- 25 December 1976: EgyptAir Flight 864 crashed into an industrial complex during landing attempt at Don Mueang International Airport, killing all 52 on board as well as 19 on the ground. Pilot error was determined to be the cause of the accident.
- 21 August 1979: A train collision at Taling Chan Junction caused 51 deaths and 138 injuries.
- 27 April 1980: Thai Airways Flight 231 stalled and crashed after entering a thunderstorm on approach to Bangkok, killing 44 out of 53 passengers and crew.
- 16 November 1980: An explosion at a Royal Thai Army armoury in Dusit District, Bangkok, kills 29 and injures about 300, as well as destroying many buildings.
- 8 November 1986: Six General Electric UM12C locomotives crashed the platform of Hua Lamphong, killing 4 people.
- 31 August 1987: Thai Airways Flight 365 crashed into the sea off Phuket Island, killing all 83 on board.
- 24 September 1990: A liquid petroleum gas tanker truck crashed on the expressway exit at New Phetchaburi Road in Bangkok, causing large explosions and fires that burned through 38 shophouses for over 24 hours. 90 persons died, 121 were injured and 43 cars were destroyed.
- 15 February 1991: A dynamite truck crashed in Thung Maphrao Subdistrict, Thai Mueang, Phang Nga, resulting in a delayed explosion that killed over 202 people and injured 525, most of them onlookers.
- 2 March 1991: A chemical explosion at Khlong Toei Port in Bangkok resulted in 60 deaths and almost 100 injuries.
- 26 May 1991: Lauda Air Flight 004 crashed in Dan Chang District, Suphanburi Province, due to an uncommanded thrust reverser deployment. All 223 on board were killed.
- 10 May 1993: The Kader Toy Factory fire in Nakhon Pathom Province killed 188 factory workers and injured over 500. Substandard and dangerous working conditions contributed to the death toll.
- 13 August 1993: Collapse of the Royal Plaza Hotel in Nakhon Ratchasima resulted in 137 deaths and 227 injuries. The failure was caused by the improper addition of three floors to the originally three-storey building in 1990.
- 14 June 1995: The floating dock at Phran Nok ferry pier in Bangkok capsized after over 100 passengers overloaded the structure's weight-bearing ability, resulting in 20 deaths and 37 injuries.
- 11 July 1997: The Royal Jomtien Resort Hotel fire in Pattaya, Chonburi resulted in 91 deaths and 53 injuries. Poor fire-preparedness and locked fire exits contributed to the number of deaths.
- 11 December 1998: Thai Airways International Flight 261 crashed on approach to Surat Thani Airport, killing 101 out of 146 passengers and crew.
- 19 September 1999: A potassium chlorate explosion in a dried-longan factory in Chiang Mai Province killed 35.
- February 2000: A radiation accident in Samut Prakan Province was caused by scrap metal collectors acquiring and dismantling an insecurely stored cobalt-60 radiation source, resulting in 3 deaths and 7 injuries.
- 6 March 2000: A phosgene gas leak at a polycarbonate factory in Map Ta Phut Industrial Estate, Rayong killed 1 and injured 814.
- 25 October 2001: An explosion at a Royal Thai Army armoury in Pak Chong District, Nakhon Ratchasima killed 17 servicemen and 1 civilian, and injured over 100.
- 16 September 2007: One-Two-GO Airlines Flight 269 crashed into an embankment at Phuket International Airport, killing 90 of the 130 passengers and crew.
- 8 April 2008: The Ranong human-trafficking incident resulted in 54 deaths.
- 1 January 2009: The Santika Club fire in Bangkok killed 66 patrons during New Year celebrations.
- 25 January 2012: Fireworks explosion in Suphun buri kills four and injures 75
- 2 April 2014: Scrapyard workers in Bangkok cut into an undetonated World War II-era bomb, causing an explosion that killed 7, injured at least 10, and resulted in extensive property damage.
- 11 August 2014: The 2014 Pathum Thani building collapse resulted in 14 deaths.
- 5 July 2018: Two tourist boats capsize in Phuket Province, killing 47 Chinese tourists.
- 22 October 2020: A gas pipe explosion in Samut Prakan killed three, and leaves many injuries.
- 5 July 2021: A chemical factory explosion in Samut Prakan kills a firefighter and injures dozens.
- 5 August 2022: The Mountain B nightclub fire in Sattahip district killed 23 patrons and injured 22.
- 29 July 2023: An explosion at an illegal fireworks warehouse in Su-ngai Kolok district killed 12, injured 121, and destroyed or damaged 292 houses.
- 17 January 2024: Another fatal warehouse fireworks explosion in Mueang District, Suphan Buri province instantly killed at least 17 to 23 factory workers, damaged four houses, and sent debris in a 100 m (328.08 ft) radius.
- 1 October 2024: A school bus crash on Vibhavadi Rangsit Road in Lam Luk Ka district, Pathum Thani province killed 23, including 20 school children.
- 29 November 2024: A motorway segment and a crane collapsed on Rama II Road in Samut Sakhon Province, killing 6 people and wounding eight more.
- 15 March 2025: A segment of the Rama III—Dao Khanong Expressway collapsed onto a road below, killing seven and injuring 13 more.
- 30 July 2025: An unlicensed fireworks factory located in Mueang District, Suphan Buri province explodes, killed at least 9 people, and left another injured.
- 14 January 2026: A construction crane fell on a passenger train with 157 people on board in Sikhio district, Nakhon Ratchasima province, killing at least 32.
- 12 July 2026: A fire broke out at a beer hall in Chatuchak district, Bangkok, killing at least 32 people and injured more than 70.
- 16 November 2026: A fire broke out at a commercial building in Patong, Phuket, killing 11 and injuring at least 16.

== See also ==
- List of earthquakes in Thailand
- List of massacres in Thailand
- Terrorism in Thailand
