= List of nightclub fires =

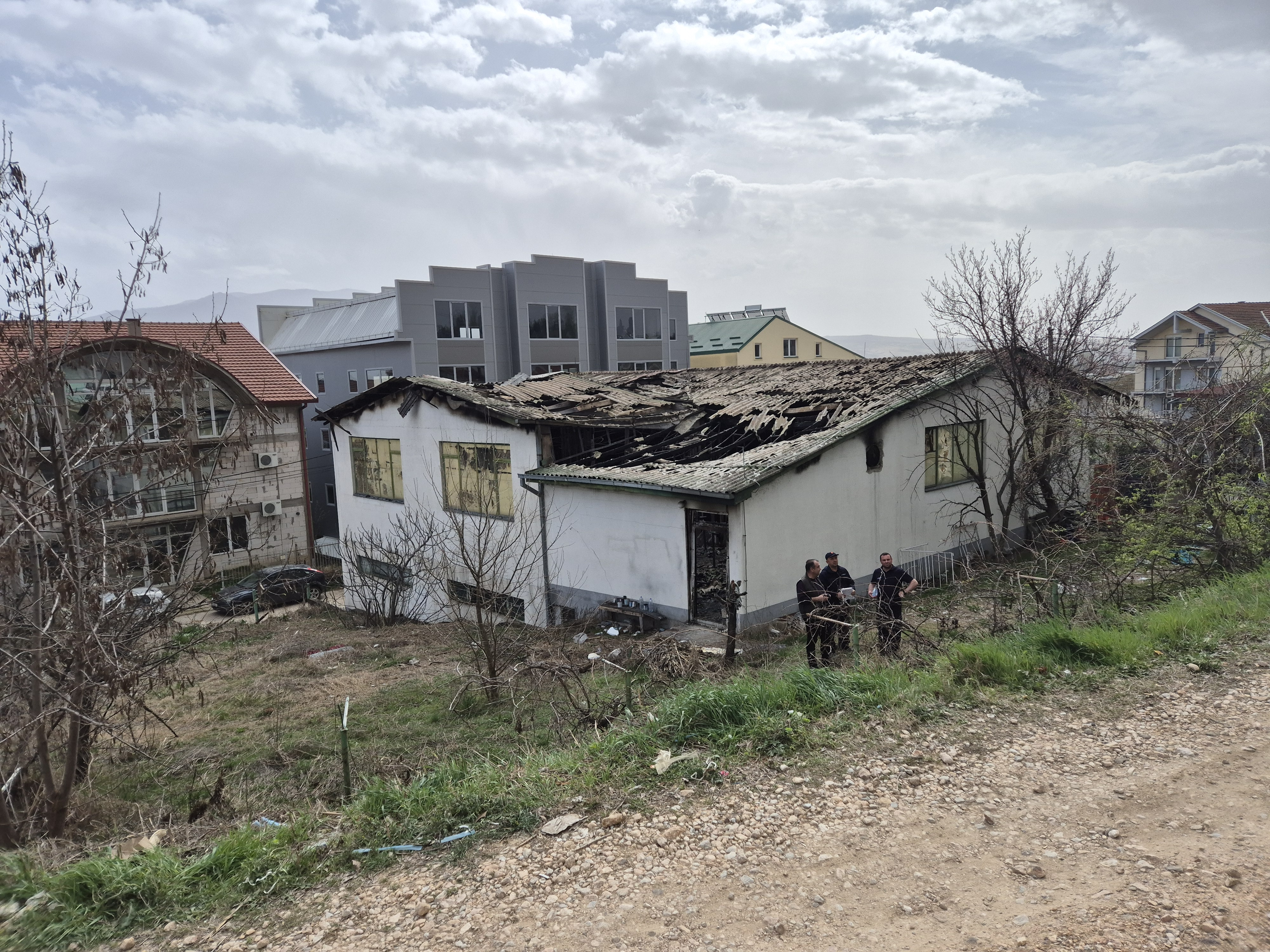
Remains of the Kočani nightclub after its 2025 fire

This is a list of notable nightclub fires at indoor and outdoor venues. Deadly nightclub fires often attribute to pyrotechnic failures, hence some of the list also feature in the list of fireworks accidents and incidents. The combination of large groups of people, limited means of evacuation, pyrotechnics, and highly combustible materials has been described as a "lethal mixture".

== List ==
Name	Location	Country	Year	Deaths	Injuries	Origin	Accelerant	Notes
Study Club fire	Detroit, Michigan	United States	1929	22	50	undetermined; possibly a lit cigarette	draperies, decorations	Prohibition-era speakeasy nightclub
Rhythm Club fire	Natchez, Mississippi	United States	1940	209	200	discarded match or cigarette	Spanish moss sprayed with Flit	At the time of incident, second-worst club fire in American history
Cocoanut Grove fire	Boston, Massachusetts	United States	1942	492	130	undetermined (disputed)	draperies, decorations, possibly a refrigerant leak (methyl chloride)	Deadliest club fire in history, and the third-worst single-building fire in American history (third only to the Iroquois Theatre fire and the September 11 attacks)
Karlslust dance hall fire	Berlin, Germany	Germany	1947	81	150	stove pipe		Worst fire disaster in Berlin since World War II; death toll reported between 80-88, but considered to be 81
Top Storey Club	Bolton, Lancashire, England	United Kingdom	1961	19			solvents, paints	14 died in the fire and 5 died of injuries received from jumping out of windows
Dale's Penthouse	Montgomery, Alabama	United States	1967	26	8	non-extinguished tobacco pipe left in jacket pocket in the cloakroom		Restaurant/lounge on the top floor of an 11-story building with no fire escape
Club Cinq-Sept fire	Saint-Laurent-du-Pont	France	1970	146		undetermined (disputed)	polyurethane, papier-mâché	
Blue Bird Café fire	Montreal, Quebec	Canada	1972	37	56	arson	gasoline	
Playtown Cabaret fire	Osaka	Japan	1972	118	81	discarded match or cigarette butt	clothing	Club on the top floor of a seven-story building with no fire escape
Whiskey Au Go Go fire	Fortitude Valley, Brisbane, Queensland	Australia	1973	15		arson	gasoline	
UpStairs Lounge arson attack	New Orleans, Louisiana	United States	1973	32	15	arson	Ronsonol lighter fluid	Deadliest arson attack in New Orleans at that time, and was the deadliest attack on LGBT people in United States history until the 2016 Pulse nightclub shooting
Gulliver's nightclub fire	Port Chester, New York	United States	1974	24	32	arson		Future Kiss drummer Eric Carr survived the fire, he played there with the band Creation.
Time Club fire	Seoul	South Korea	1974	64		short circuit		The total death toll for the entire Daewang Corner building fire was 88; 8 died from jumping out of windows
Dance bar 6-9 fire	La Louvière	Belgium	1976	15	40	cigarette lighters during a power failure	paper and plastic party decorations	
Puerto Rican Social Club fire	New York City	United States	1976	25	24	arson	gasoline	
Beverly Hills Supper Club fire	Southgate, Kentucky	United States	1977	165	200	possibly electrical	carpeting, wooden paneling	Third-worst club fire in American history
Fire at Stadt	Borås	Sweden	1978	20	59	most likely a discarded cigarette		High-school graduation party at city hotel
Infinity Disco fire	Manhattan, New York	United States	1979	0	0	possibly arson		Former location of Pfaff's Beer Cellar
Denmark Place fire	Central London	United Kingdom	1980	37	23	arson	gasoline	
Limelight Disco fire	Hallandale, Florida	United States	1980	0	1	possibly arson		Formerly the Old Heidelberg restaurant and Rumbottoms disco
Stardust fire	Artane, Dublin	Ireland	1981	48	214	electrical water heater	flammable internal materials, locked and blocked exits.	
Alcalá 20 nightclub fire	Madrid	Spain	1983	82	27	electrical		
Chowon (Greenfield) disco fire	Daegu	South Korea	1983	25	67	short circuit		Mostly underage victims; exit reportedly chained shut to prevent them from leaving without paying
Common People fire	Seoul	South Korea	1984	10	2	oil stove knocked over during quarrel	oil fire spread to the couch	Fire broke out at 4:20 am; victims mostly underage
Happy Land fire	The Bronx, New York	United States	1990	87	6	arson	gasoline	Fifth-worst club fire in American history
Flying nightclub fire	Zaragoza, Aragon	Spain	1990	43		electrical		
Daegu Gosonggwan fire	Daegu	South Korea	1991	16	13	arson	6 liters of gasoline	Fire started by spiteful rejected customer
Kheyvis fire	Olivos, Buenos Aires	Argentina	1993	17	24	burning furniture (prank)		Second-worst club fire in Argentine history
Yiyuan Disco fire	Fuxin, Liaoning	China	1994	233	16	sofa (caused by burning newspaper)	decorations	
Ozone Disco fire	Quezon City, Metro Manila	Philippines	1996	162	95	possibly electrical		Worst fire in Philippine history
Rolling Stones fire	Seoul	South Korea	1996	11	3	discarded cigarette butt	wet paint	Fire trucks delayed by cars parked in narrow alley
Gothenburg discothèque fire	Gothenburg	Sweden	1998	63	214	arson		Most victims were underage - event for secondary school students
Incheon club fire	Incheon	South Korea	1999	56	78	basement construction work		Mostly underage victims; exit reportedly chained shut to prevent them from leaving without paying
LA2 fire	London	United Kingdom	1999	0		pyrotechnics		Pyro from the band Toilet Böys set fire to netting suspended from the ceiling
Luoyang Christmas fire	Luoyang, Henan	China	2000	309	7	welding		Second deadliest nightclub fire in history. Construction and retail staff in the same building evacuated after internal broadcast, nightclub patrons on level four were forgotten about
Lobohombo explosion	Mexico City	Mexico	2000	22	24		gas canisters	
Volendam New Year's fire	Volendam	Netherlands	2001	14	241	pyrotechnics (sparkler)	decorations (Christmas)	
Canecão Mineiro nightclub fire	Belo Horizonte	Brazil	2001	7	197	pyrotechnics		
Myojo 56 building fire	Kabukicho, Shinjuku	Japan	2001	44	3	suspected arson		Fifth-deadliest fire in post-war Japanese history
Club La Guajira fire	Caracas	Venezuela	2002	47	28		Christmas decoration	Bouncer delayed exit asking patrons not to leave without paying
Utopía nightclub fire	Santiago de Surco, Lima	Peru	2002	29	57	torch	acoustic foam	
The Station nightclub fire	West Warwick, Rhode Island	United States	2003	100	230	pyrotechnics	acoustic foam	Deadliest firework accident and fourth-deadliest club fire in American history
República Cromañón nightclub fire	Buenos Aires	Argentina	2004	194	1432	pyrotechnics	plastic net (media sombra), styrofoam and wood decorations, acoustic panels	Worst club fire in Argentine history
El Festival Ballroom fire	Houston, Texas	United States	2004	1	3	arson		Firefighter killed in fire; initially thought to have been started by a truck, quickly ruled as arson
911 nightclub fire	Moscow	Russia	2007	10	4	pyrotechnics		
Lounge cafe fire	Novi Sad	Serbia	2008	8	2	arson	shag carpet on the walls	Fire was intentionally set by a patron named Miloš Malešev. He was sentenced to nine years and his companion to two years. Two owners of the bar were sentenced to seven years each
Quito Ultratumba nightclub fire	Quito	Ecuador	2008	15	35	pyrotechnics		This incident prompted years of investigation, including a human rights investigation and summary report
Wuwang Club fire	Shenzhen, Guangdong	China	2008	43	88	pyrotechnics		
Santika Club fire	Watthana, Bangkok	Thailand	2009	67	222	fireworks or electrical explosion	tar paper, plastic waterproofing	
Lame Horse fire	Perm	Russia	2009	158	≤160	pyrotechnics	decorations (willow twig)	Worst fire in Russia since the dissolution of the Soviet Union
Sabor Latino fire	Rome	Italy	2010	4		electrical	acoustic foam	
Jack Daniels nightclub fire	Taichung	Taiwan	2011	9	13			Originated during a fire show by a male dancer on stage, described as holding sparklers, a torch, or LED torch that malfunctioned and produced sparks
Kontrast discotheque fire	Novi Sad	Serbia	2012	6	4	electrical		Four persons were sentenced to between five and nine years in 2014
Tiger Disco fire	Patong, Phuket	Thailand	2012	4	11	electrical	acoustic foam	Officially attributed to a short circuit, some reports stated that the fire started when lightning struck a nearby transformer
Kiss nightclub fire	Santa Maria, Rio Grande do Sul	Brazil	2013	242	630	pyrotechnics	acoustic foam	Worst club fire and second worst fire disaster in Brazil, third deadliest club fire in history
Musi-café	Lac-Mégantic	Canada	2013	28	unknown	train derailment	crude oil	Sixth deadliest rail accident in Canadian history
Colectiv nightclub fire	Bucharest	Romania	2015	64	160	pyrotechnics	acoustic foam (polyurethane)	Worst club fire in Romanian history
Ghost Ship warehouse fire	Oakland, California	United States	2016	36	2	undetermined, possibly electrical	N/A	Converted warehouse used as an art collective and venue. Fire officials say staircase to second floor was made out of wooden pallets
Cuba Libre bar fire	Rouen	France	2016	14	6	pyrotechnics	polystyrene ceiling tiles	Candles on a birthday cake started the fire after the person who carried it tripped on the stairs leading to the basement. Flames set the polystyrene ceiling tiles of the basement ceiling alight
2016 Hanoi karaoke bar fire	Cầu Giấy, Hanoi	Vietnam	2016	13		welding		
Magway karaoke bar fire	Magway	Myanmar	2017	16		gas leak		
Yaoundé nightclub fire	Yaoundé	Cameroon	2022	16	8	fireworks		Fireworks ignited the ceiling; eventually spread to gas bottles, causing explosions
Sorong nightclub fire	Sorong, West Papua	Indonesia	2022	19		rioting		One victim died from stabbing during clashes
Mountain B nightclub fire	Sattahip, Chonburi	Thailand	2022	26	22	possibly electrical	soundproof foam	
Binh Duong karaoke bar fire	Thuận An, Bình Dương	Vietnam	2022	32	3	short circuit		
Kostroma café fire	Kostroma	Russia	2022	13	5	pyrotechnic flare		Initial reports say that a pyrotechnic flare was released by a Russian soldier who had just returned from Ukraine
Fonda Milagros nightclub fire	Murcia	Spain	2023	13		unknown		
Gayrettepe nightclub fire	Beşiktaş, Istanbul	Turkey	2024	29	8	possibly welding		
2024 Hanoi karaoke bar fire	Hanoi	Vietnam	2024	11	2	arson	gasoline	Fire started by patron following an argument with staff
Kočani nightclub fire	Kočani	North Macedonia	2025	63	195	pyrotechnics		Sparks from pyrotechnics hit the ceiling, which was made of highly flammable material, before rapidly spreading
Birch by Romeo Lane nightclub fire	Arpora	India	2025	25	50	firecrackers	dried palm leaves	
Crans-Montana bar fire	Crans-Montana	Switzerland	2026	41	115	lit sparklers	acoustic foam	Sparklers placed on champagne bottles were held too close to acoustic foam on the ceiling, setting it alight
Rong Beer Na Lat Phrao beer hall fire	Chatuchak, Bangkok	Thailand	2026	41	64	short circuit in air conditioner (initial reporting)	acoustic foam	Early reports say an air conditioner short-circuited, igniting flammable ceiling decorations. Reports also say emergency exits may have been obstructed

== See also ==
- List of fires
- List of building or structure fires
- List of fireworks accidents and incidents, many of which caused a nightclub fire.
