= 2026 Bangkok pub fire =

Fire in Bangkok, Thailand

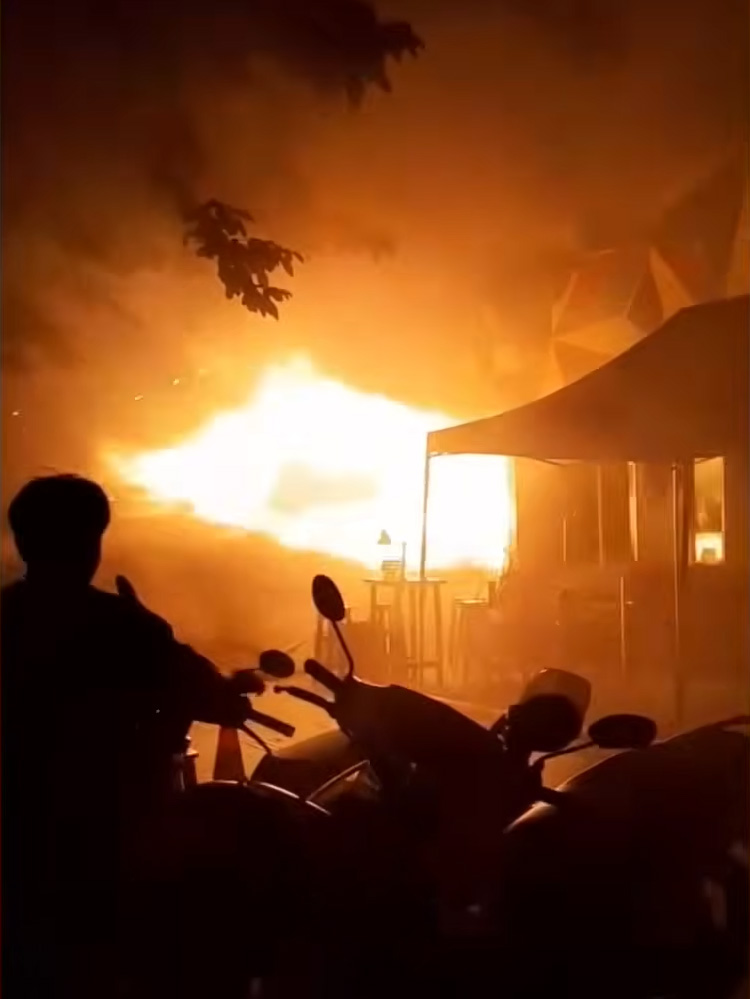
- Outside of the pub during the fire
- Date: 12–13 July 2026
- Time: 23:57 (ICT; UTC+7)
- Location: Rong Beer Na Lat Phrao, Chatuchak district, Bangkok, Thailand; 13°48′48″N 100°33′40″E
- Type: Building fire
- Cause: Under investigation
- Deaths: 41
- Injuries: 70+

On 12 July 2026, a fire occurred shortly before midnight ICT (UTC+07:00) at the Rong Beer Na Lat Phrao (Thai: โรงเบียร์ ณ ลาดพร้าว, lit. 'Beer Hall of Lat Phrao'), a beer hall and live-music venue in the Chatuchak district of Bangkok, Thailand. The fire killed 41 people and injured more than 70, of whom 24 were reported to be in critical condition. The fire was the deadliest in Thailand since the 2009 Santika Club fire in Bangkok during New Year celebrations, which killed 67 people.

The cause remains under investigation and city officials said an electrical short circuit in a ceiling-mounted air-conditioning unit was their initial assessment.

== Background ==
Rong Beer Na Lat Phrao was a restaurant, beer hall, and live-music venue opened in 2023. It is located on the Lat Phrao Road, near Union Mall and the Phahon Yothin MRT station. The building had two main entrances and two fire exits.

The owners of Rong Beer Na Lat Phrao, Suwicha and Bangorn Sailabath, founded the Rong Beer Na Lat Phrao Ltd. on 14 November 2024, with Suwicha holding 95% of the company's stake while the remaining 5% belong to Bangorn. The company originally registered its business purposes as "selling food, alcoholic beverages, as well as hosting various musical and entertainment shows", this was later changed to simply "conduct the restaurant business."

=== Previous incidents ===
Thailand has experienced previous fatal entertainment-venue fires. The Santika Club fire in Bangkok killed 67 people and injured more than 200 on 1 January 2009, while a fire at the Mountain B music pub in Chonburi province in 2022 caused 26 deaths and 22 injured.

== Fire ==
Bangkok's city government said the fire began shortly before midnight on 12 July. Emergency services received a report at 23:57, and firefighters brought the blaze under control in about half an hour.

Officials said the fire began near the front stage area and spread rapidly. The power failed when the fire started, leaving the interior dark. Many patrons moved towards the kitchen and bathrooms at the rear of the building, where firefighters later found many of the victims. The interior, furniture and ceiling were extensively damaged.

Prime Minister Anutin Charnvirakul said a musician performing at the venue reported seeing smoke from a circuit breaker near the stage before the power failed. The musician then heard an explosion and said that thick smoke quickly filled the building. Footage verified by news agencies showed smoke and flames emerging from the front entrance as customers fled, some with their clothing on fire.

== Casualties ==
Officials said that at least 28 people were confirmed killed at the scene and more than 70 were hospitalized, including 24 in critical condition. The deceased were identified as 18 women and 9 men. Initial findings indicated that most died from smoke inhalation. Authorities established a registration point for relatives and began identifying the dead and injured. On 14 July, the death toll rose to 30. On 15 July, the death toll rose to 32, after two people died from their injuries. Later that same day, another victim died, bringing the death toll to 33. On 19 July, the death rose again to 34 when a woman died of her injuries. On July 22, another victim died as a result of the fire, raising the death toll to 35. On 25 July, the sound technician of Thotsakan, Benz, died of his injuries, raising the death toll to 36. On July 27, the death toll rose again to 37 when a woman succumbed to her injuries from the fire. On August 11, another woman died of her injuries raising the death toll to 38. A security guard has died in hospital on 16 August 2026, bringing the death toll to 39. Two more victims died on August 18, raising the death toll to 41.

Among the injured was Suwicha Sailabath, one of the co-owners of the venue who was inside during the fire. One Laotian worker was among the deceased while two others were injured. Three members of Thotsakan, a Thai indie rock band that performed during the night before the fire occurred, ended up succumbing to their injuries, according to band member Patchara Songphatkaew in a Facebook post; they were the keyboardist, Kwang; the female singer, Breeze; and the drummer, Bew.

== Investigation ==
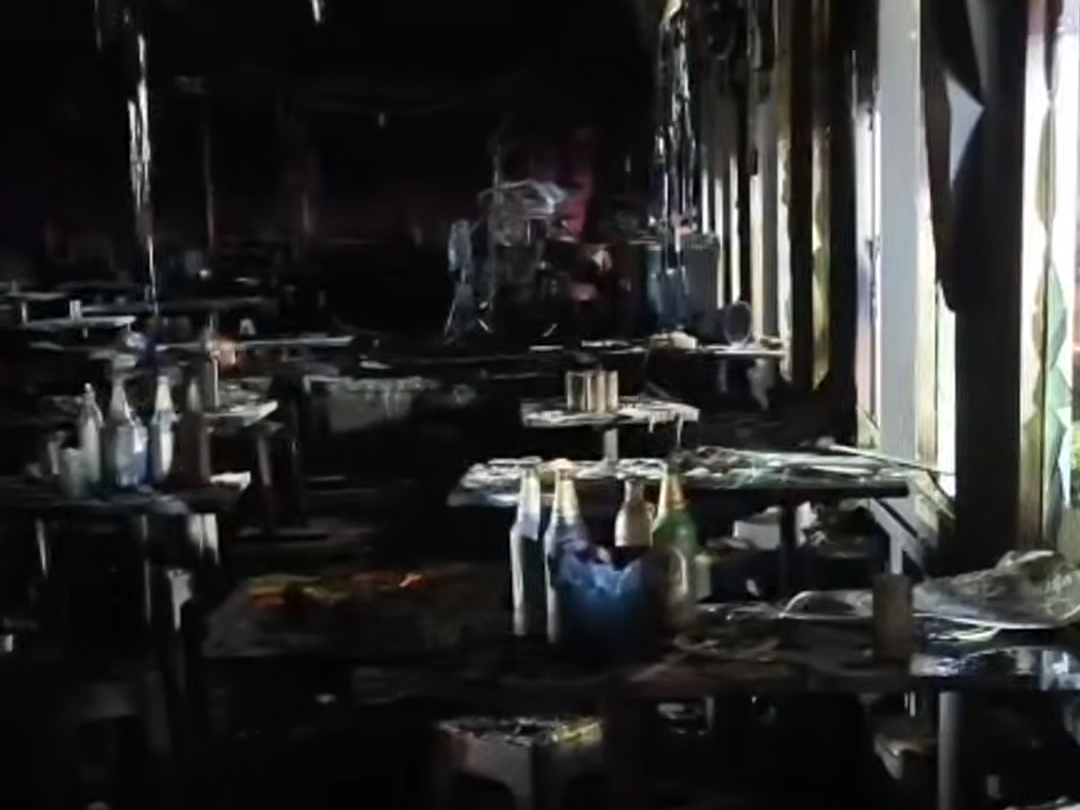
Inside the venue after the incident

The site was cordoned off on 13 July while forensic officers examined the remains of the building. Although the cause had not been established, Bangkok's disaster administration said its initial assessment was that an electrical short circuit in an air conditioning unit in the ceiling started the fire, which was further exacerbated by the flammable soundproofing ceiling directly beneath. Governor Chadchart Sittipunt said that investigators would examine the ceiling materials and whether emergency exits had been obstructed. He said beer crates obstructed one exit near the kitchen and a table obstructed another. He also said that flammable ceiling decorations may have contributed to the fire's rapid spread.

The pub was not legally required to use fire-retardant materials since it was officially registered as a "restaurant with live music" instead of an "entertainment venue."

== See also ==
- List of disasters in Thailand
- List of nightclub fires
- 2026 Crans-Montana bar fire in Switzerland
- 2025 Arpora nightclub fire
