= Rhythm Club fire =

1940 dance hall fire in Mississippi that killed 209

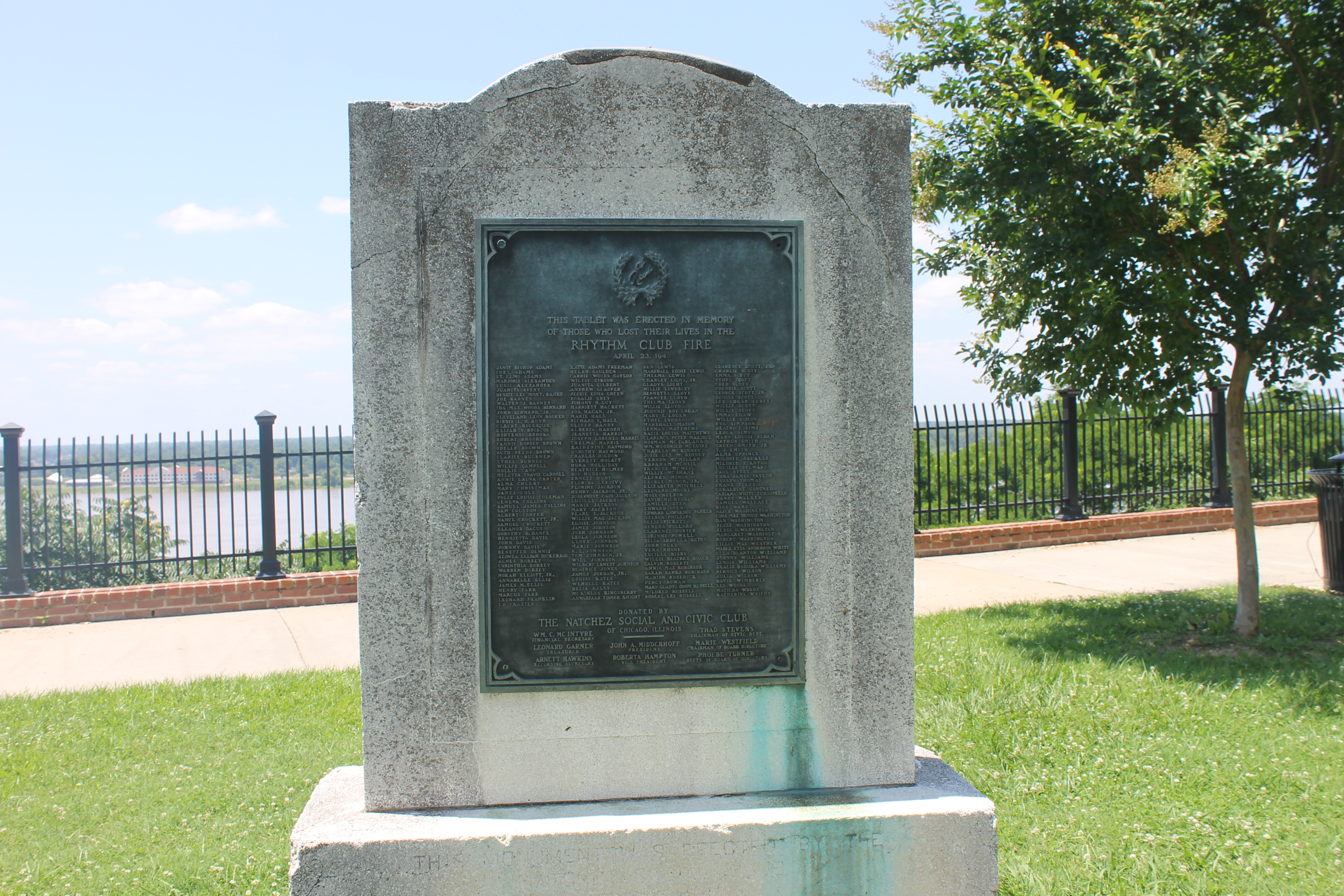
- Plaque listing those who perished in the fire
- Location of Rhythm Club
- Date: April 23, 1940
- Time: 11:30 p.m.
- Venue: Rhythm Club
- Location: Natchez, Mississippi, United States; 31°33′33″N 91°23′51″W
- Type: Fire
- Deaths: 209

The Rhythm Club fire (or The Natchez Dance Hall Holocaust) was a fire in a dance hall in Natchez, Mississippi, on the night of April 23, 1940, which killed 209 Black Americans and severely injured many others. Hundreds of people were trapped inside the building. It is the fourth deadliest assembly and club fire in U.S. history.

== Club ==
The dance hall, a converted blacksmith shop once used as a church, was in a one-story steel-clad wood-frame building at 1 St. Catherine Street, 18 blocks from the city's business district. The building was owned by the Byrnes family and was leased by a social group called the Money Wasters. The group hosted events and dances and brought in a live band to perform. The original band that was scheduled to perform was Tiny Bradshaw and his orchestra, but due to a scheduling conflict the band canceled and was replaced by Walter Barnes and His Royal Creolians, an orchestra from Chicago. Money Wasters member Ed Frazier ran the club on the night of the fire.

The premises was a single-story, wood building with corrugated steel siding that was 120 ft (36.6m) x 38 ft (11.6 m) with 24 windows that were mostly shuttered or nailed shut at the time of the fire. There was only one exit, with an inward opening door, that opened into a main entrance foyer that had another set of doors that also opened inward.

== Fire ==
On the night of the fire, the club recorded 577 paid admissions and 150 passes, and the orchestra had 14 members and 5 attendants, bringing a likely final total number of people at the club to 746. Advance tickets for admission cost $0.50, tickets at the door cost $0.65, and the average age of attendees was between 15 and 25 years old. Many attendees were members of the Money Wasters club and their friends. Walter Barnes and His Royal Creolians was performing when the fire started near the main entrance door around 11:00 pm and, fed by Spanish moss that had been draped over interior's rafters as a decoration, quickly engulfed the structure. To ensure there were no bugs in the decorative moss, it had been sprayed with FLIT, a petroleum-based insecticide. Under the dry conditions, flammable methane gas was generated from the moss.

The Natchez Fire Department did not yet exist, but two volunteer companies provided one full-time firefighter. One of the men lived and worked from the Phoenix Fire Station, about four blocks from the Rhythm Night Club. The fire station received its first telephone call about the club fire at around 11:15 p.m. The first fire engine arrived within minutes, and the first hose was targeted at the front entrance and upper ceiling of the lobby and the second was sent into a small open window at the rear of the club. The sound of the victims screaming could be heard through the town. The fire was put out after around ten to thirty minutes.

Twenty-one of the 24 existing windows had been boarded up to prevent outsiders from viewing or listening to the music, and as a result the crowd was trapped. Some survivors were able to get out the front door or through the ticket booth, while others tried to press their way to the back door, which was padlocked and boarded shut. Upon realizing their limited options to escape the fire, many victims attempted to break through the corrugated steel walls of the building, but were unsuccessful. People broke through windows using their hands and chairs, but the windows became jammed. Blinding smoke made movement difficult. Survivors remembered the burning moss falling from the ceiling and forming a barrier between the dance floor and the exit, with the moss igniting clothing and hair of victims and survivors. The front door was the only exit, and the doors swung inward. Escape from the main entrance was made almost impossible as flames blocked the entrance, pushing the crowd towards the back of the club. Due to the walls being made of metal, and little ventilation for the heat or the smoke, the walls held the heat in the club like an oven. When water from the fire hoses hit the metal siding, it created steam that scalded many victims. Doctors later found that most of the dead had been suffocated by smoke inhalation or crushed as the crowd was pushed to the rear of the building. Most of the bodies were found piled near the rear of the building by the bandstand, the stacked bodies reaching shoulder height.

Ambulances took the victims and survivors to hospitals in the city, and despite strict segregation laws, the white medical establishment treated survivors over the following weeks and months. Throughout the night of the disaster, firemen, medical professionals, and civilian volunteers worked to remove bodies and search for signs of life in the club. Floodlights were brought in to help in the search. Even after the bodies were removed and the site cleared, the smell of burned bodies hovered over Natchez for months.

Bandleader Walter Barnes and nine members of his band were among the victims. The band was credited with attempting to calm the crowd and Barnes was praised as a hero for leading the song "Marie" by Irving Berlin as the fire raged. The bandmates who died were John Reed Jr., James Coles, Clarence Porter, Henry Walker, Paul Scott, Calvin Roberts, Jesse Washington, and his vocalist Juanita Avery. One of the group's two survivors, the drummer Walter Brown, vowed never to play again; the other survivor was the bassist Arthur Edward. Barnes was well regarded as a strong competitor with his contemporaries Duke Ellington and Woody Herman. Ed Frazier of the Money Wasters also died in the fire.

Most of the dead were identified, but there were a number of bodies that were burned beyond recognition. These unidentifiable bodies were buried in a mass grave. Due to the time of the fire, there were issues dealing with the number of the dead, with segregation affecting the time that the bodies were properly seen to. Under segregation, only African American morticians were allowed to handle African American dead, and the three local black funeral homes had too many bodies to handle. Some victims had insurance policies and burial contracts, but there were some who did not leave behind a means of paying for burial expenses. Natchez undertakers and burial associations turned to the Natchez Chamber of Commerce for financial support. The Central Burial Association branch manager J. L. Poindexter spoke to the Natchez Chamber of Commerce and assured the city that the association was capable of fully covering its members' burials. Local victims were buried at the Watkins Street Cemetery. In the aftermath of the fire, citizens of Natchez raised more than $5,000 to help the local Red Cross.

== Aftermath ==
People believed the fire to be accidental, started by a carelessly discarded match or cigarette that then ignited the decorative Spanish moss. Other sources claim a fire from a hamburger stand located near the exit spread to the Spanish moss and grew rapidly. A large fan at the front of the entrance was also thought by some to have strengthened the fire. The day after the blaze, five men were arrested following reports they had drunkenly threatened in an argument to burn the building down. Charges against them were later dropped. Hotel employee Ernest Wright stood by the entrance on the night of the fire and later reported that he heard two women arguing, with one accusing the other of setting the club on fire. All indications in later investigations pointed to an accidental cause of the fire.

Photos donated to the Rhythm Nightclub Fire Museum in 2015 show the coffins of the band members who died in the fire being escorted by African-American boy scouts on a train. More than 15,000 mourners attended the funeral of Walter Barnes, and the Natchez Social and Civic Club of Chicago raised money for the victims' families and for the memorial. The Natchez Social and Civic Club of Chicago brought the memorial tablet, which cost $350.00 to create, to Natchez in September, 1940. The dedication service was held at the Zion Chapel AME church and a local park, and around 5,000 people attended the services.

There were no building occupancy restrictions at the time of the fire. Future laws and codes would limit the number of people allowed in a structure and require doors to open outward to prevent people from being trapped.

The fire helped bring forward building requirements that were aimed at making night clubs safer in the event of a fire. Requirements for nightclubs now include the installation of fire protection systems, provisions for safer building finishes and decorations, provisions for better exiting systems, and for clubs to have trained crowd managers on duty. Calls for stricter fire laws and addressing overcrowding in buildings and schools.

On November 6, 2010, the Rhythm Club Museum, commemorating the tragedy, opened in Natchez. The site where the fire happened remains empty and exists today as an empty grassy plot of land with a memorial sign inside informing passersby of the tragedy.

== Depiction in media ==
A documentary film, The Rhythm Club Fire, was completed in December 2012. The documentary is now available on Youtube. Atlanta playwright Danese Frazier Turner, granddaughter of Ed Frazier, wrote, produced and co-directed a play titled “Death by Dancing” commemorating the disaster. Purpose and Power Connection, a worship arts ministry, presented the production.

The disaster was memorialized in songs such as "Mississippi Fire Blues" and "Natchez Mississippi Blues", by the Lewis Bronzeville Five; "The Natchez Fire", by Gene Gilmore; "The Death of Walter Barnes", by Leonard Caston; "The Natchez Burnin", by Howlin' Wolf; and "Natchez Fire", by John Lee Hooker. A memorial marker was erected in Bluff Park in Natchez. A historical marker has been placed at the site of the club, which contains a museum to the club and the fire as of 2016.

== See also ==
- List of nightclub fires
- Study Club fire, night club fire that killed 22 and injured 50 people
