= Suphan Buri fireworks explosion =

Fireworks explosion in Suphan Buri, Thailand

- Date: 17 January 2024; 2 years ago
- Time: 3:30 pm (GMT+7)
- Location: Village Moo 3, Ban Khoi Ngam, Sala Khao, Mueang District, central Suphan Buri Province, Thailand; 14°27′16″N 99°59′02″E
- Type: Fireworks disaster
- Deaths: 23 (one presumed dead)

On 17 January 2024, at approximately 3:30 pm local time, an explosion at a fireworks factory in Ban Khoi Ngam, Sala Khao, Mueang District, central Suphan Buri Province, Thailand, killed at least 17 people, with the final death toll confirmed at 23. According to then-National police chief Torsak Sukvimol, 22 bodies were found, and one more person was presumed dead. He and other rescue workers also stated that there were no survivors of the fatal explosion. The blast instantly killed the 23 workers who were inside the compound at the time, with the force spreading debris and human remains in a radius of 100 m (328.08 ft) away from the factory. It also damaged four houses located 300 m (984.24 ft) away.

== Background ==
Deputy Prime Minister Somsak Thepsuthin stated that he was informed that the blast was caused by gunpowder sparking inside the factory, and potassium chloride stored inside intensified the explosion. Local authorities also estimated the fireworks factory had at least 500 kg of explosive material inside the compound before the explosion. On 30 November 2022, a worker was killed and 3 more were seriously injured after a blast at the same factory, according to Torsak Sukvimol.

Similar fatal firework-related incidents are not uncommon in Thailand, as 24 different fireworks explosions across the country, many of which fatal, were reported over the course of 16 years as stated by the Thai Division of Injury Prevention (DIP). In July 2023, there was another comparable devastating fireworks warehouse explosion in Su-ngai Kolok district, Narathiwat province, southern Thailand which killed at least 11 people, and injured 118. Witnesses say that the blast happened at around 15:00 local time. According to the Narathiwat province's Public Relations, the explosion affected more than 200 households, 100 of which damaged, within a 1,640 ft radius. Trakul Totham, the governor of Narathiwat Province, speculated that the blast was likely an accident, most likely ignition by construction work inside the warehouse.

== Aftermath ==
Suphan Buri governor, Nattapat Suwanprateep, stated that the EOD team confirmed 23 deaths, including seven women and 16 men. However, an earlier report showed the confirmed deaths and names of those killed that included 12 women and eight men, according to local officials. The remains of those killed were transported by rescue workers to the nearby temple of Wat Rong Chang. Relatives of the victims gathered there to confirm and inspect those who were killed. Kritsa Manee-In, a rescue worker for the Samerkun Suphan Buri Rescue Foundation stated that an exact count of the number of people killed was difficult to confirm, as the bodies were dismembered and scattered throughout the area.

On 30 July 2025, another notable fatal fireworks explosion happened at Ban Pho Tha Sai, Ban Pho, Mueang District, Suphan Buri, at about 11:00 am, killing nine people, all of them Thai women, and leaving another injured. One of those killed was pregnant, and the blast itself destroyed a car and 2 wooden houses. Local authorities set up an aid centre nearby. Police Senior Sergeant Major Pinyo Chanmanee said that the fireworks factory wasn't clear if it had a license to operate.

== See also ==
- 2012 Suphan Buri Province fireworks explosion
- Map Ta Phut Industrial Estate
- Sungai Kolok fireworks disaster
- List of fireworks accidents and incidents
