= Toronto propane explosion =

2008 industrial disaster in Toronto, Canada

Coordinates: 43°43′57″N 79°28′22″W

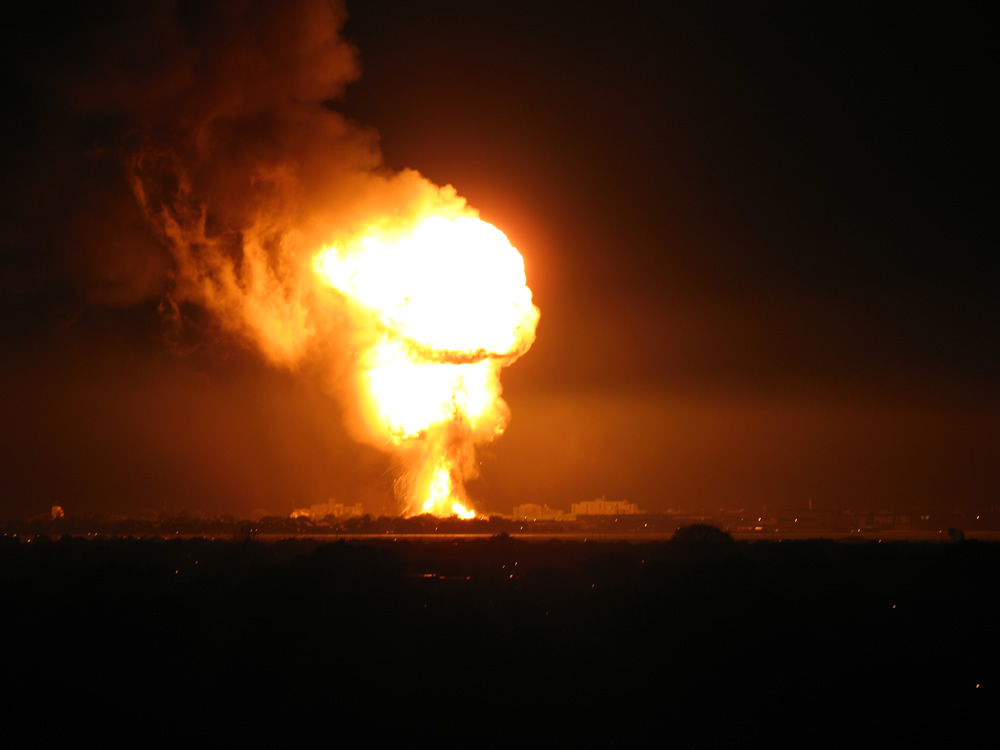
- The explosions seen from midtown Toronto, Ontario.
- Date: August 10, 2008
- Time: 03:50 ET
- Location: 54 Murray Road Toronto, Ontario, Canada
- Cause: Illegal tank-to-tank transfer of propane, resulting in a gas hose leak
- Deaths: 2

The Toronto propane explosion (also known as the Sunrise Propane incident) was a series of explosions and ensuing fire that took place on the morning of August 10, 2008, in the Downsview neighbourhood of North York, Toronto, Ontario, Canada. The explosions occurred at the Sunrise Propane Industrial Gases propane facility, located near Keele Street and Wilson Avenue around 03:50 ET. The blasts caused thousands of people to be evacuated from their homes and cost C$1.8 million to clean up, half of which was paid by the province of Ontario. An employee of Sunrise died in the initial explosions and a firefighter died of cardiac arrest the next day while at the scene.

== History ==
Sunrise Propane Industrial Gases was a company that sold propane for commercial and home purposes, in addition to other gases such as helium and acetylene. The company had operated under a number of names since at least 1999. In 2002, a company named Sunrise Petroleum was successfully sued by First Choice Petroleum Inc., an oil and lubricants supplier, who claimed the company owed them C$54,063.73 in products and had forged a document to avoid settling their account. In that case, it was found that Sunrise had forged the signature of a First Choice employee named Thomas Tims in a 1999 document, which stated Sunrise Petroleum would be taken over by a new company called Sunrise Petroleum Lubricants and that Sunrise Petroleum would thereby not be responsible for any outstanding, unpaid, or unsettled accounts. However, Tims would not have signed the document because he was listed on it as "Tim Toms", rather than Tom Tims. As a result of the case, Sunrise was forced to pay the account owed plus interest, totalling C$93,389.54, and an additional C$34,284.71 in legal fees. Court documents also revealed a third name, Sunrise Propane & Petroleum, that the company had previously used.

An Ontario corporate profile states the facility was incorporated in 2004, though a Sunrise corporate solicitor and spokesperson is uncertain how long the facility was in operation. The facility was built in a residential neighbourhood in Toronto's North York district. Toronto mayor David Miller stated that the facility was allowed to be built in the neighbourhood under zoning that was in place for over a decade.

The facility had previously been warned by Ontario's Technical Standards and Safety Authority for its lack of safety by not ceasing to conduct truck-to-truck transfers at the company's facilities. During the investigation following the explosions, investigators found that truck-to-truck transfers were common at the facility. Truck-to-truck transfers are prohibited in Ontario because they increase the risk of a gas leak or a fire.

== Incident ==
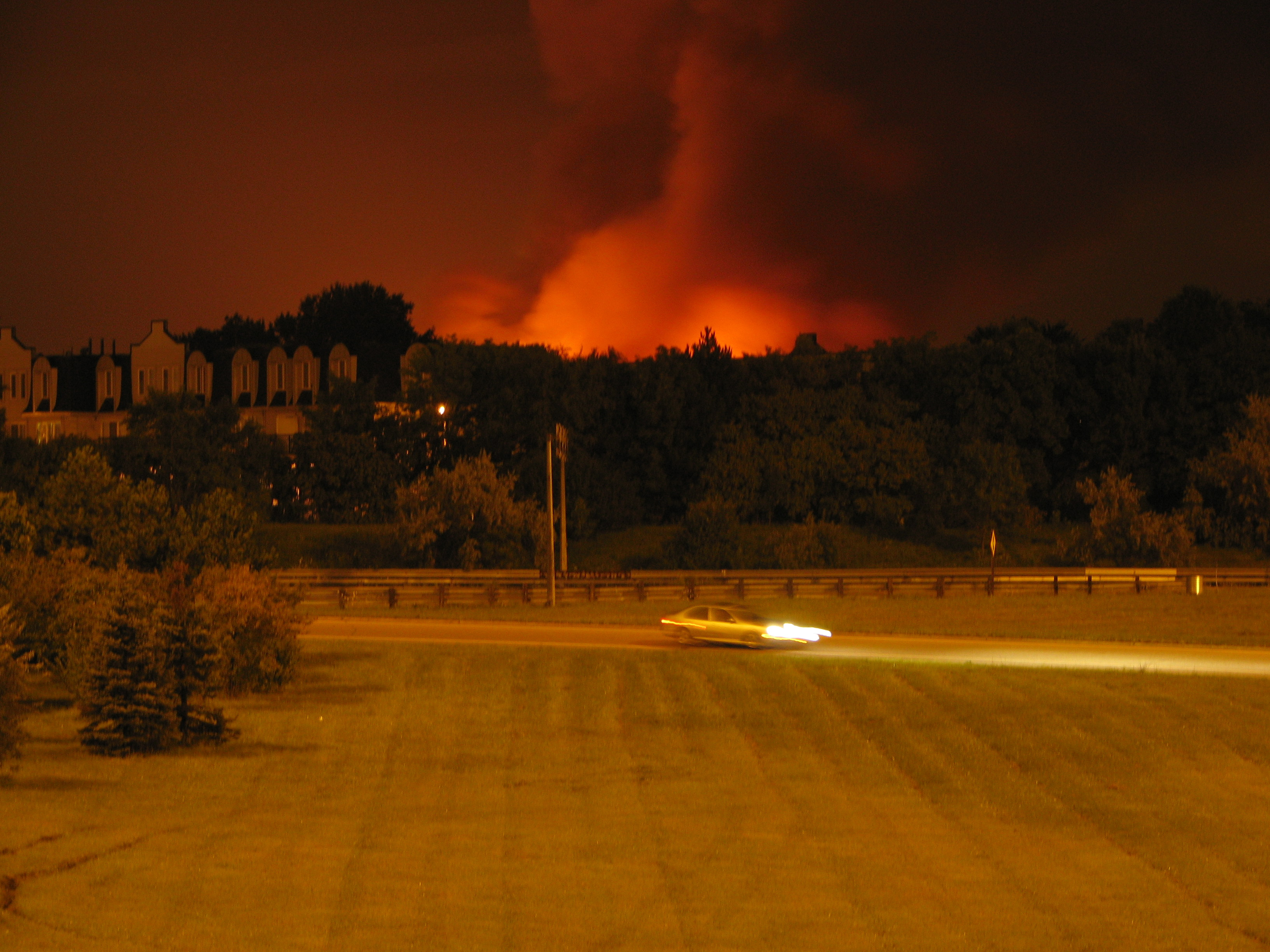
The explosion seen from the Keele overpass

At approximately 03:50 ET on the morning of August 10, 2008, a large gas explosion occurred at Sunrise Propane Industrial Gases, located near Murray Road and Spalding Road. This was followed by a series of explosions, including several BLEVEs (boiling liquid expanding vapor explosions), that sent large fireballs and clouds of smoke billowing into the sky. Large pieces of metal from the exploding propane tanks were ejected onto nearby streets and properties. Many homes and offices were damaged, windows were shattered, and doors were ripped from their hinges. About 200 firefighters battled the seven-alarm fire that resulted from the explosions.

The threat of further blasts and concerns about the air quality forced the police to conduct a voluntary evacuation of a large area in the surrounding community. Residents living within a 1.6-kilometre (1 mi) radius were told to leave their homes in the early hours of the morning. Toronto Transit Commission buses were used to evacuate them to Downsview Park and then to York University.

The explosions rocked the area and also caused the closure of part of Highway 401, between highways 404 and 400, for over 12 hours. Emergency crews feared another major explosion as two rail tankers continued to burn more than five hours after the initial explosion. Regular commercial air traffic was allowed to continue in and out of Pearson International Airport while smaller, privately owned aircraft were restricted from flying over the area.

Six people were sent to the hospital, 18 people admitted themselves to emergency clinics, and Emergency Medical Services treated 40 people on the site. During the course of the emergency response to the scene, a Toronto firefighter was found lifeless by emergency crews. Paramedics and firefighters tried to revive him but were unsuccessful. He was then rushed to a hospital where he was pronounced dead. The firefighter was identified as Bob Leek, a 55-year-old district chief of emergency planning and a 25-year veteran. Leek, who was off duty that night, had been asked to bring some equipment to aid the activities of his colleagues, which he did. He just happened to have had a heart attack at that time. Sunrise employee Parminder Saini was unaccounted for. On August 11, a body was found at the scene. On September 3, the body was confirmed to be that of Saini.

== Cause and investigation ==
The Ontario Fire Marshal's Office handled the investigation of the explosions. While the cause of the explosions had not yet been determined, on August 21, 2008, Ontario's independent safety regulator for fuels, the Technical Standards and Safety Authority (TSSA), released a statement saying that, just before the explosion, a truck driver was illegally transferring propane from one truck to another. The agency also reported that, in November 2006, Sunrise Propane was warned about its lack of safety from not stopping the truck-to-truck transfers at the company's facilities, and that truck-to-truck transfers were a frequent and routine operating practice at the facility. An investigator with the Ontario Fire Marshal's Office stated that it could take months before the cause of the explosions could be determined. Ontario Premier Dalton McGuinty also said that the province was willing to provide financial aid to residents whose homes were damaged by the explosions.

On August 4, 2010, the Toronto Star reported that the massive Sunrise propane explosion in 2008 was caused by an illegal "tank-to-tank transfer" along with a gas hose leak. The report said that liquid propane was released from a hose after a "tank-to-tank transfer" was completed. The Star reports that Sunrise did not have the right licence to perform those types of transfers and that it was previously barred from doing so by the TSSA in November 2006.

The Environment Ministry has argued that Sunrise failed "to show that there was a proper preventative maintenance system in place." Leo Adler, Sunrise's lawyer, argued that the event was an unforeseeable accident because Sunrise kept their equipment in good order and cannot be held responsible for a hose failure.

== Aftermath ==
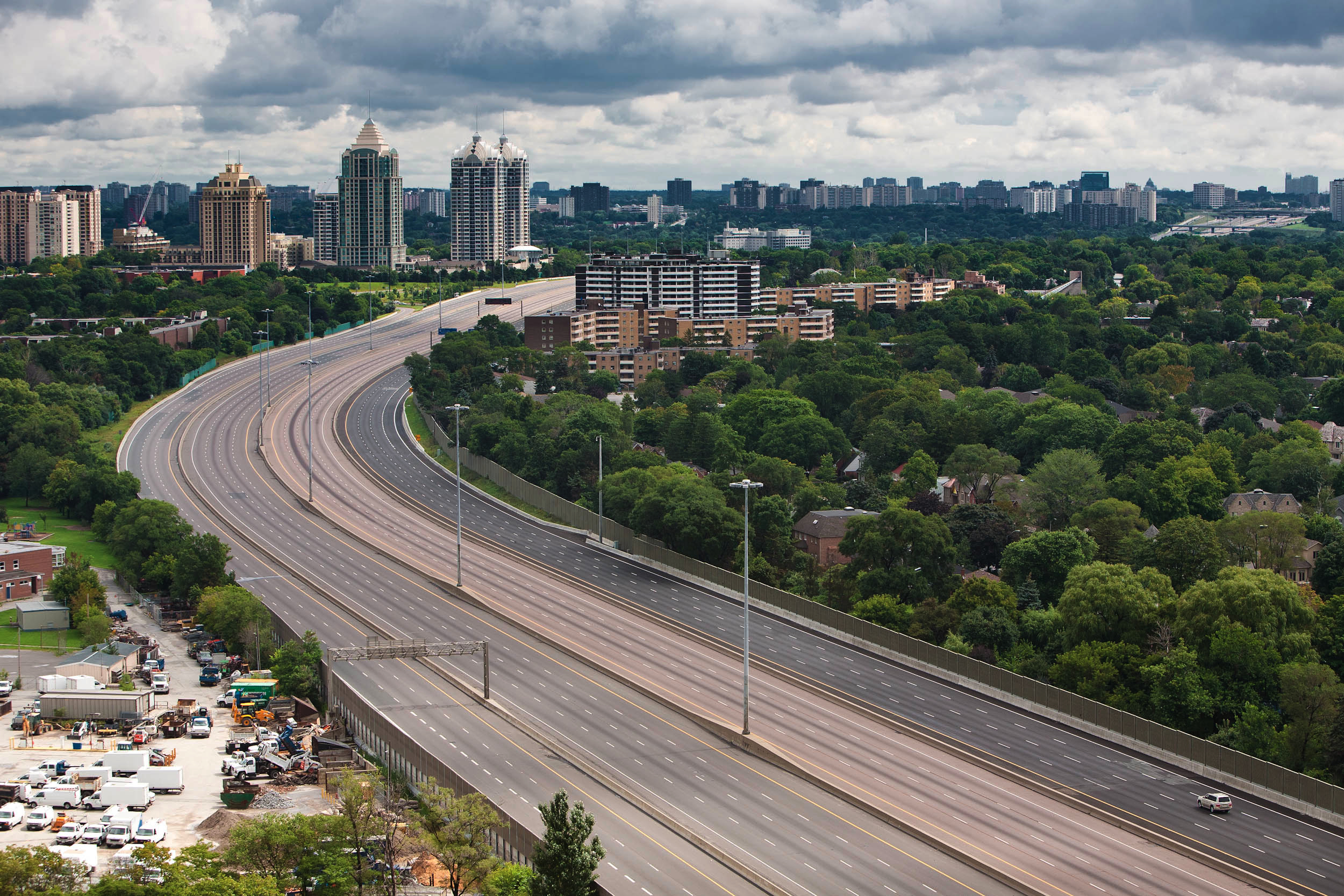
Highway 401 was closed due to its proximity to the explosion.

Due to its proximity to the site, Highway 401 was shut down from Highway 404 to Highway 400, and the local Yorkdale Mall was closed for part of the day. Toronto Transit Commission routes and the York Region Transit Viva Orange route were affected as a result of evacuation zone. Bus routes were diverted and a section of the Yonge-University-Spadina subway line between Downsview Station and Lawrence West Station was shut down for part of the day. GO Transit services to Yorkdale Bus Terminal were also suspended.

About 15 hours after the first explosions, some residents were allowed to return to their homes. However, many people returning to their homes were stopped at police checkpoints and turned back, or not permitted to take their vehicles into the immediate area. Approximately 100 of the 12,000 evacuated homes were left uninhabitable. On August 11, almost all residents who had to be evacuated were allowed back, though about 35 families had to wait while tests by health officials were conducted over concerns about airborne asbestos.

As a result of the explosion, Toronto officials planned to review all industrial areas that could pose a potential threat to residential neighbourhoods to prevent similar situations. As part of its investigation, TSSA officials and the Ontario Fire Marshal reviewed past inspections of the facility to determine the cause of the explosions.

The explosion caused damage to one of Toronto's oldest Jewish cemeteries, the Mount Sinai Memorial Park. The cemetery is over 100 years old and has more than 11,000 graves, of which at least 20 were damaged.

Various residents were angered because the municipal government allowed Sunrise to build a propane facility in a residential area. Some residents claimed the community was not consulted or notified about the facility when it was being built. However, Shelley Carroll, Toronto's acting deputy mayor, suggested that the facility had been zoned before many of the homes were built.

The TSSA, which regulates fuel safety in Ontario, originally said it had only inspected Sunrise once since the facility opened in 2005. TSSA later contradicted this by stating it had issued stop-work orders in 2006 and 2007 over safety violations.

On August 19, nine days after the explosions, Sunrise issued a short news release, stating that the company regretted the loss of life and that they were co-operating with authorities' investigations. The news release also said that they would not be making any more public comments in the near future to prevent speculation and misinformation. On August 21, 2008, the TSSA issued a notice that Sunrise Propane should immediately have its authorization revoked.

Six other propane facilities in the province were shut down as a result of an audit prompted by the explosions. Facilities in Kitchener, Waterloo, Cornwall, Ottawa, and two in Toronto were ordered to shut down after failing to show that their employees had been properly trained at the facilities.

Parminder Saini's father was granted a visa to travel from Punjab to Canada to aid in the investigation, but his brother and mother were initially denied visas by the Canadian Consulate. This decision was later changed after the Department of Citizenship and Immigration was informed of the situation.

Felipe De Leon, an employee at Sunrise, stated that he had completed an illegal propane transfer when he noticed smoke at the north end of the facility. De Leon said he then went inside the facility's office to warn Saini to flee the building, who however refused. De Leon then fled from the facility while Saini walked towards the smoke.

Cleaning up cost the city of Toronto C$1.8 million, half of which was paid by the province of Ontario.

== Charges and lawsuits ==
On August 5, 2009, the Ontario Ministry of Labour laid two charges in the incident: one relating to the failure to protect Saini and another alleging failure to operate within mandatory industry standards. These had potential fines totalling up to C$1 million. Eight charges by the Ontario Ministry of the Environment carried potential fines of more than C$6 million. On June 27, 2013, Sunrise Propane was found guilty of nine non-criminal charges. On January 25, 2016, Sunrise Propane and its directors Shay Ben-Moshe and Valery Belahov were fined $5.3 million for the offences. Sunrise was no longer in operation at the time and the defence lawyer argued his clients did not have the money to pay millions in fines. Additionally, the area residents filed a $300 million lawsuit.

== See also ==
- 1979 Mississauga train derailment: the last large-scale explosion, fire, and evacuation in the greater Toronto area prior to the Sunrise blast.
- 1990 Bangkok gas explosion
