= 2026 Patong fire =

Fire in Thailand

- Date: November 16, 2026
- Time: 03:17 a.m. (Note: Reuters and Al Jazeera reported that the fire started at "about 3:17 a.m." Bangkok Post, The Independent, and Thai PBS reported a start time of "about 3:15 a.m.".) (ICT; UTC+7)
- Location: Patong, Phuket, Thailand
- Deaths: 11
- Injuries: 16

On 16 November 2026, at approximately 3:17 a.m., a fire in a commercial district in Patong, Phuket, Thailand, killed 11 people and injured 16 more.

== Fire ==
The fire started at approximately 3:17 a.m. on the ground floor of a commercial building on Phangmuang Sai Kor Road, where a motorcycle rental company was located. From there, the fire spread to other floors of the building. Firefighters spent two hours getting the fire under control. The building housed approximately 100 motorcycles, alongside other combustible materials such as gasoline and engine oil. Governor of Phuket Province Chotnarin Kerdsom said these materials may have contributed to the spread of the fire, as well as the toxic smoke.

As of 16 November, Phuket police were investigating the cause of the fire, but had ruled out arson as a cause. Initial investigations found a transformer exploded before the fire started, potentially caused by a short circuit on a nearby power pole during a rainstorm.

== Casualties ==
Eight men and three women were killed. According to governor Chotnarin Kerdsom, the victims had likely died from smoke inhalation. Deputy mayor of Patong Sanakorn Keesin noted the victims likely tried to reach the rooftop. One survivor said the thick smoke limited visibility, making it difficult to find the staircase to escape.

Of the 16 injured, 15 were Thai nationals and one was a Myanmar national.

== See also ==
- 2026 Bangkok pub fire
