= TSSA =

TSSA may refer to:

- Transport Salaried Staffs' Association
- Technical Standards and Safety Authority
