= 1990 Bangkok gas explosion =

Gas explosion from crashed tanker truck

Coordinates: 13.74977°N 100.54931°E

- Date: 24 September 1990
- Location: Bangkok, Thailand
- Type: Explosion
- Deaths: 88
- Injuries: 36

The gas explosion on New Phetchaburi Road in Bangkok was a major disaster in Thailand. It took place on 24 September 1990, when a liquid petroleum gas tanker truck crashed on the expressway exit at New Phetchaburi Road, causing large explosions and fires that burned through 51 shop-houses for over 24 hours. 88 people died, 36 were injured and 67 cars were destroyed, making it one of the deadliest man-made disasters in Thailand.

== Incident ==
The incident occurred at around 22:00, when an employee of Siam Gas was driving a tank truck off the Chaloem Maha Nakhon Expressway onto New Phetchaburi Road while speeding to beat a stoplight. The truck overturned as it made the turn at high speed and slid across the road, scraping against the pavement. The two gas tanks, each containing 3,770 liters of fuel, detached from the vehicle and began leaking. The escaping gas ignited, creating sparks and several loud explosions. Within minutes, New Phetchaburi Road and the surrounding area were engulfed in fire.

== Legacy ==
A 2002 horror film, The Eye, based its climactic scene on this incident.

== See also ==
- List of disasters in Thailand
- Toronto propane explosion
