= Canecão Mineiro nightclub fire =

2001 disaster in Minas Gerais, Brazil

- Date: November 24, 2001
- Location: Belo Horizonte, Minas Gerais Brazil.
- Cause: Pyrotechnics
- Deaths: 7
- Injuries: 197

A fire occurred on 24 November 2001 in the Canecão Mineiro nightclub in Belo Horizonte, Minas Gerais, in southeastern Brazil, killing seven people and injuring 197 others. The fire was caused by pyrotechnics set off on the stage.

== Incident ==
On November 21, 2001 the band "Armadilha do Samba" was one of the three bands playing and around 1,500 people were present. The fire started when a band member set off the indoor firework cascade right before the second act. Witnesses say that the fireworks were set on stage and the sparks quickly reached the ceiling and the soundproofing equipment, which was made out of polystyrene, to catch on fire. It is said that a security guard tried to put out the fire with an extinguisher but ended up spreading the fire even more.

At the time, the concert hall did not have an operating business license nor emergency exits; it had turnstiles controlling entry and exit and the main entrance. The fire caused a short circuit and the lights went out, with smoke rising, victims were rescued by firefighters through ropes and ladders.

== Victims ==
Seven people were killed and over 300 out of 1,500 in attendance were injured. During an interview with Globo, the musician II Brener explains what he witnessed that night. He was backstage when the fire erupted but quickly went on stage right when the security guard was trying to put out the fire. He stated that while walking to the main exit, he inhaled a lot of smoke and pieces of plastic burned his skin. Brener spent 15 days in a coma due to smoke inhalation and 3rd degree burns.

== Investigation ==
The first panel of the Superior Court of Justice (STG) confirmed the municipal of Belo Horizonte's civil liability of the fire that occurred in Canecão Mineiro. Unanimously, the panel upheld the internal appeal filed by the Public Defender's Office of Minas Gerais against their original decision of ordering the Court of Justice of Minas Gerais (TJMG) to re-judge the case.

The Court of Justice of Minas Gerais (TJMG) recognized the civil liability since the concert hall did not have an operating business license and had not adopted fire prevention measures. However, at the Superior Court of Justice (STG), the municipal of Belo Horizonte stated that the lack of inspection did not make them civilly responsible for the emotional, material nor physical damages caused to the victims.

According to Minister Sérgio Kukina, the case's rapporteur, the Court of Justice of Minas Gerais (TJMG) concluded that the Belo Horizonte municipal failed to exercise their police power by not preventing the concert hall from operating without a valid license. Based on that, the Belo Horizonte municipal administration contributed to the production of damages caused by the fire. If any changes were made to this decision to avoid responsibility "would require a new examination of the factual and evidentiary collection contained in the records, a measure prohibited in a special appeal, by the impediment provided for in Precedent 7/STJ". Regarding the statement about civil responsibility for emotional, material, and physical damages caused to the victims, the minister confirmed that the allegations were not a violation of federal law.

== Legal ==
Seven people were convicted of involuntary manslaughter: the band's manager, two musicians, two show promoters, the owner of Canecão Mineiro, and his brother. In 2004, all seven were sentenced to four years in open prison. In 2008, their sentences were revised by the Court of Justice of Minas Gerais (TJMG) regarding the provision of community service.

== See also ==
- List of nightclub fires
