= Technical Safety Authority of Saskatchewan =

Technical Standards and Safety Authority
- Abbreviation: TSASK
- Formation: 2010
- Type: Standards organization
- Headquarters: 2202 2nd Avenue; Regina, Saskatchewan; S4R 1K3
- Region served: Saskatchewan
- CEO: William Scott
- Staff: 55
- Website: www.tsask.ca

Technical Safety Authority of Saskatchewan is an arms length agency of the Government of Saskatchewan, responsible for the inspection and safety monitoring of boilers, pressure vessels, gas, electrical, plumbing, elevating devices and amusement park rides in the province. At its creation, 52 Licensing and Inspections Branch staff were transferred from the Ministry of Corrections, Public Safety and Policing.

== See also ==
- Canadian Standards Association
- Technical Standards and Safety Authority - equivalent organization in Ontario
