= Club Cinq-Sept fire =

1970 nightclub fire in Auvergne-Rhône-Alpes, France

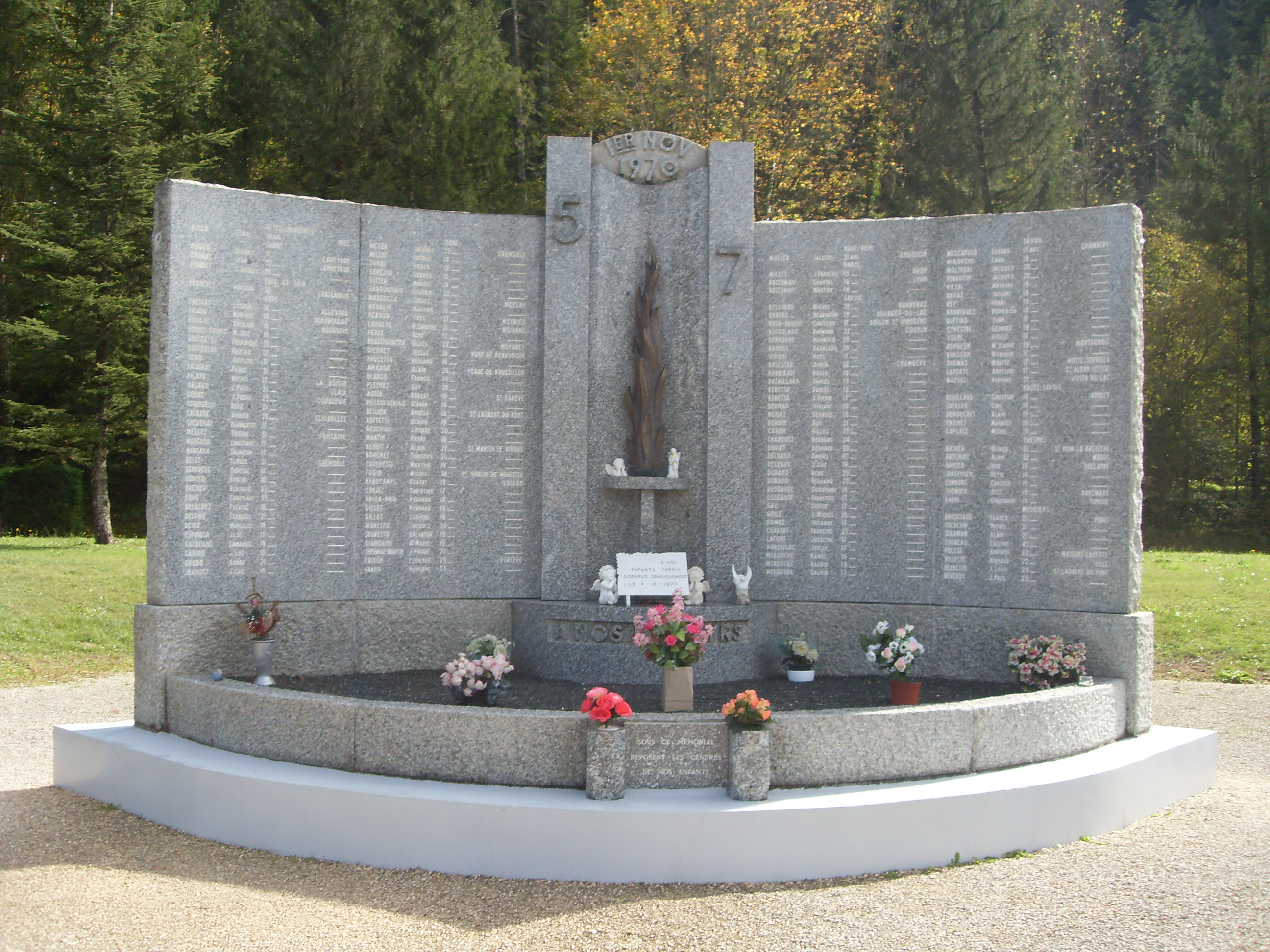
- The memorial.
- Date: Sunday, 1 November 1970
- Time: Around 1:40 a.m.
- Location: Saint-Laurent-du-Pont, Isère, France; 45°22′59″N 5°42′37″E
- Cause: Ignition of interior fittings made of polyurethane and papier-mâché
- Deaths: 146
- Suspects: Gilbert Bas, club manager Mayor of Saint-Laurent-du-Pont; Several building contractors
- Charges: Manslaughter, numerous building code and safety violations
- Verdict: Guilty
- Convictions: Manslaughter

The Club Cinq-Sept fire was a major blaze at a nightclub just outside Saint-Laurent-du-Pont, Isère, France, on Sunday, 1 November 1970. The fire claimed the lives of 146 people, almost all of whom were aged between 17 and 30. The scale of the disaster shocked the country. Subsequent official enquiries revealed a catalogue of shortcomings, oversights and evasions with regard to fire safety at both local and département level. Criminal charges were brought against a number of people; some received suspended prison sentences.

== Venue ==
The Club Cinq-Sept (or Club 5–7), which was situated in a relatively isolated location 1.5 miles (2.4 km) from Saint-Laurent-du-Pont, opened for business in April 1970. It was housed within a newly constructed large, open-plan windowless structure with external walls built of cinder blocks supporting a corrugated iron roof. The main entrance to the club was via a spiked full-height turnstile. The ground floor housed a dance floor, bar and restaurant, with simulated grottos constructed of polyurethane and papier-mâché around the walls. A single spiral staircase led to a gallery which ran right round the building and contained more alcoves and grottos. The roof was supported by pillars which were decorated with various flammable materials.

The Club Cinq-Sept quickly established itself as a popular draw for young people in the region, attracting customers from Saint-Laurent-du-Pont, the nearby towns of Chambéry and Voiron, and the city of Grenoble, 20 miles (32 km) away.

== Fire ==
On the night of 31 October/1 November 1970, the Club Cinq-Sept had drawn a large crowd to watch a live performance by Les Storms, an up-and-coming six-piece rock group from Paris. An estimated 180 people were still in the club at 1:40 a.m. when a fire broke out. It was reportedly caused by a carelessly discarded match igniting a foam-filled seat cushion on the first-floor gallery.

The blaze spread rapidly through the roof space fuelled by the building's flammable décor and furnishings. People in the gallery struggled to escape down the single spiral staircase as flames spread across the ceiling. Only 30 people within the main club area managed to exit the building via the main entrance turnstile before a wall of fire plunged down from the gallery turning the whole building into an inferno. Survivors later claimed that the emergency exits had been padlocked and then nailed shut with planks to stop anyone from sneaking into the venue without paying.

Few managed to escape after this point, and of those who did, most suffered severe burn injuries. A group of four survivors claimed they were able to escape the premises shortly after noticing the flames and attempted to pry open the emergency exit doors to help others escape. Additionally, they claimed that some passers-by noticed their attempts to help, and most did not stop to help but instead laughed at them.

The club had no telephone on the premises. One of the club's managers, Gilbert Bas, was among those who had managed to escape and he had to drive into Saint-Laurent-du-Pont to raise the alarm. With the great speed with which the fire engulfed the building and the delay in alerting the emergency services, there was little the arriving firefighters could do when they eventually reached the club. A firefighter was later quoted as saying "There wasn't a murmur or a cry. Imagine our horror when the first group succeeded in getting the door open and then felt bodies falling on them."

The fire's intensity completely gutted the building's interior and caused the roof to melt and collapse.

== Victims ==
When firefighters were able to enter the building, they found 142 bodies within, most too badly burned for visual identification to be possible. Six badly-injured survivors were transferred to a specialised burn treatment unit in Lyon; four would succumb to their injuries, bringing the final death toll to 146. Two of the club's three managers were among the dead, as were all six members of Les Storms.

== Investigation and prosecution ==
Three days after the fire, the mayor of Saint-Laurent-du-Pont and the secretary-general of the Isère département were removed from their duties. This rapid move provoked a degree of controversy as it was seen by some, including a number of local politicians in Isère, as premature scapegoating before the full facts had been investigated.

An official enquiry held in Grenoble found that many fire safety regulations had been breached. Planning permission had been obtained for the construction of the building, but French law also required an inspection of the finished structure by building safety and fire department officials prior to opening for business; this had not been done. There was no firefighting equipment on the premises, and unsafe materials were inappropriately used for internal furnishing and decoration. The gallery level had no emergency exit; its only means of egress was the spiral staircase and through the main club.

The inquiry heard that, as required by law, the club had two exit doors in addition to the main entrance. However, in contravention of fire regulations, neither was marked; also, both were routinely locked and barred by the club managers in order to prevent patrons inside the building opening them to let others in free of charge. Although three managers held keys, two had succumbed to the effects of the fire and the third, Bas, had left to raise the alarm. The investigation heard how a man who had earlier escaped from the building managed to break open one of the doors, through which one woman was rescued alive; many others trapped behind the doors trying to escape had already perished.

In June 1971, Bas was charged with, and found guilty of, manslaughter in relation to the deaths. He received a two-year suspended sentence, converted to 6 months imprisonment on appeal by the prosecutor. The mayor and three building contractors were found guilty of causing injury through negligence, and received short suspended sentences. Gilbert Bas died on 20 January 2021.

== See also ==
- List of nightclub fires
