= Walter Barnes (musician) =

American jazz clarinetist, saxophonist, and bandleader (1895–1940)

- Born: July 8, 1895; Vicksburg, Mississippi, U.S.
- Origin: Chicago, Illinois, U.S.
- Died: April 23, 1940 (aged 44); Natchez, Mississippi, U.S.
- Genres: Jazz
- Instruments: Clarinet, saxophone

Walter Barnes (July 8, 1895 – April 23, 1940) was an American jazz clarinetist, saxophonist, and bandleader.

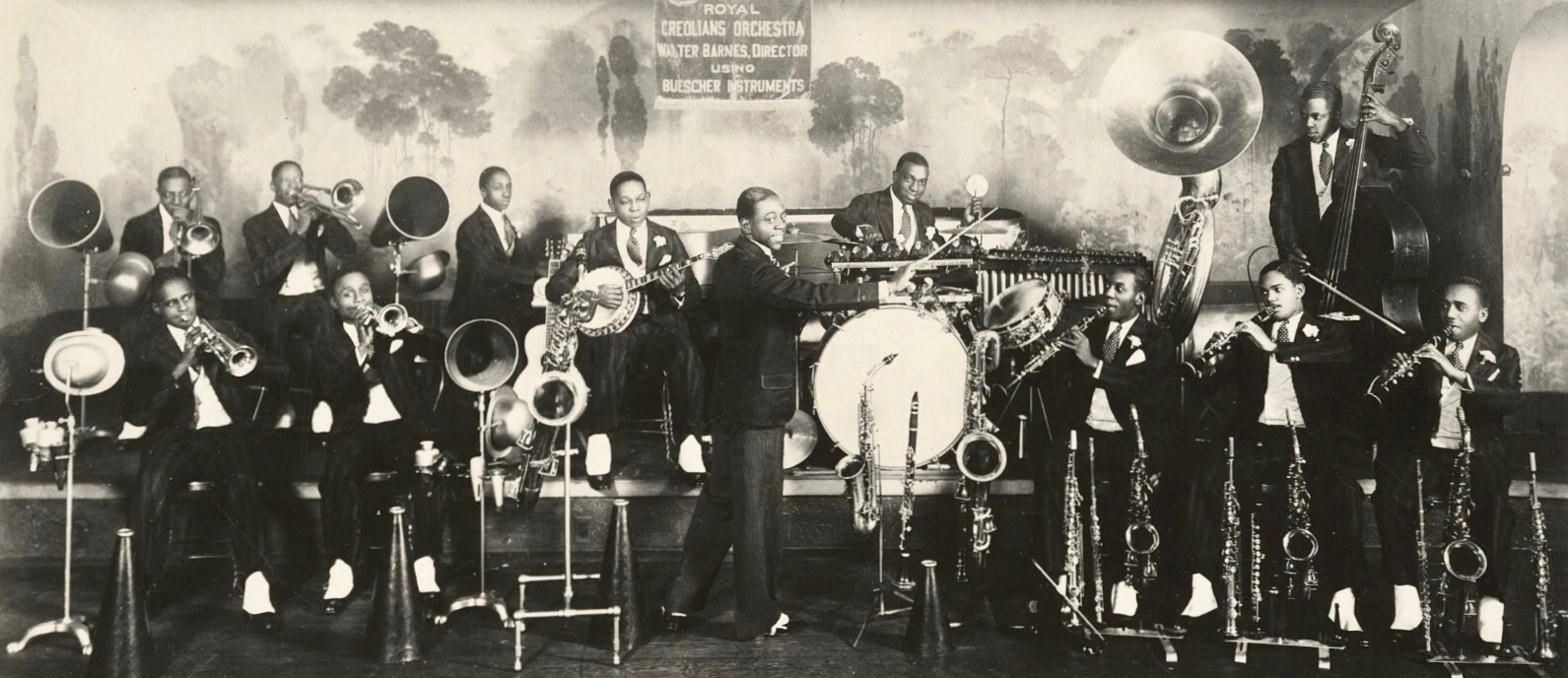
Barnes (standing center) with his Royal Creolians Orchestra, 1928

== Early life and education ==
Barnes was born in Vicksburg, Mississippi, but grew up in Chicago. He studied under Franz Schoepp in addition to attending the Chicago Musical College and the American Conservatory of Music.

== Career ==
Barnes led his own bands from the early 1920s in addition to playing with Detroit Shannon and his Royal Creolians. After Shannon's retinue became dissatisfied with his leadership, Barnes took control of this group as well. He played mostly in Chicago, though the band did hold a residency at the Savoy Ballroom in New York City as well. His band recorded in 1928 and 1929 for Brunswick Records.

He toured the American South in the 1930s to considerable success, touring there yearly; by 1938 his ensemble included 16 members. Around this time, Barnes also worked as a columnist for the Chicago Defender newspaper, and used his position to advertise his own tours and promote other entertainers on the same touring trail. Barnes is thus credited as an early originator of the so-called "Chitlin' Circuit".

Barnes was one of the victims of the Rhythm Club fire in Natchez, Mississippi, on April 23, 1940. When the club caught fire, he had the group continue playing the song "Marie" in order to keep the crowd from stampeding out of the building. The band that took the stand at the Rhythm Club on April 23 consisted of Paul Stott, Calvin Roberts, James Cole, John Reed, Jesse Washington, John Henderson, Clarence Porter, Harry Walker, Arthur Edwards, Walter Brown, and Juanita Avery. All of the band's members, except for drummer Walter Brown and bassist Arthur Edward, were among the 201 victims of the fire. Barnes's death was repeatedly immortalized in song thereafter.

Jo Jones, drummer with the Count Basie Orchestra at the time, related in an interview how arrangements were made to hire one of Barnes' tenor saxophone players, to whom Jones only referred to by the nickname of "Pimpy," as a replacement for Herschel Evans, effective after completing one last tour with Barnes.

== Additional sources ==
- Howard Rye, "Walter Barnes". Grove Jazz online.
- Walter Barnes at AllMusic
