= 2025 Arpora nightclub fire =

Fire in Arpora, Goa, India

- Date: 6 December 2025
- Time: 11:45 p.m. (IST)
- Duration: ~2 hours
- Venue: Birch by Romeo Lane
- Location: Arpora, Goa, India; 15°34′19″N 73°45′39″E
- Cause: Under investigation; probable burst firecrackers
- Deaths: 25
- Injuries: ~50

On 6 December 2025, a fire killed 25 people and injured 50 at the Birch by Romeo Lane nightclub in Arpora, Goa, India. The incident occurred when the club was hosting a dance party. The fire started at around 11:45 p.m. IST, and spread through the venue. The access to the night club was through a narrow lane, which made it difficult for the firefighters. It took two hours to put out the fire, and the rescue operations continued until the morning of the next day.

As per the authorities, the fire was concentrated around the kitchen on the ground floor, and the cause of the fire is suspected to be burst electrical firecrackers. The fire was exacerbated by dried palm leaves used for decoration. Subsequent investigation revealed that the night club had violated several government regulations, and had been involved in litigation. As per the government, 20 of the 25 deceased were employees for the club, and were from various states across India.

In the aftermath, the Government of Goa ordered an investigation into the case, and audits of all the night clubs in the area. The Goa Police arrested five people in the case and detained the sarpanch of the panchayat in which the club was located. The owners of the club, Saurabh Luthra and Gaurav Luthra, fled to Thailand to evade arrest.

== Background ==
The Birch by Romeo Lane was a nightclub opened in 2024 in the Arpora area of Goa. The club was issued a legal notice in November 2024 as the structure was built illegally on a salt pan near a popular beach. It was issued demolition notices by the local gram panchayat and the Goa coastal zone management authority, but they were stayed by the directorate of panchayats of Goa after an appeal by the owners. The club was located on an island, and had a narrow entrance and exit. On 6 December 2025, the club reportedly hosted a "Bollywood Banger Night" dance party.

== Incident ==
At around 11:45 p.m. IST, a fire started at the nightclub. There were at least 100 people on the dance floor at the time. As the area of destruction was concentrated around the kitchen on the ground floor, the fire was later presumed to have started from there. The fire spread quickly in part due to the dried palm leaves used for temporary decorations, which caught fire easily. Several nearby residents and a security guard near the venue reported hearing a loud blast. The original blast was reported powerful enough to engulf the entire building within seconds.

The police received an emergency call at 12:04 a.m. IST on the next day. Due to the location of the club within a constrained lane, fire trucks had to be parked about 400 m (1,300 ft) away from the site, which hampered the evacuation and firefighting efforts. The director general of Goa Police confirmed that the fire was brought under control in two hours. Rescue operations continued into the morning.

=== Cause ===
While the fire was originally suspected to have been caused by a liquefied petroleum gas cylinder explosion, it has since been ruled out as a cause. As per preliminary reports, the fire was caused by the bursting of improperly used indoor electrical firecrackers.

=== Victims ===
Government authorities reported that 25 people were killed in the fire. Three of the victims of the fire were women. Of the 25 victims, 21 were members of the staff at the venue, while the other four were tourists from different places. Officials later revealed that 20 of the deceased staff at the club were Indians who came from the states of Jharkhand, Uttarakhand, Maharashtra, Assam, Uttar Pradesh, West Bengal, and Karnataka, and one was a citizen of Nepal. All four tourists who had died in the fire were members of the same family from Delhi.

The bodies were recovered and sent to the Goa Medical College hospital for post mortem. Most of the victims had died from suffocation, with only three dying of burn injuries. Many were suspected to have died after running towards the basement and becoming trapped, with bodies of two of the victims found on the staircase leading to the ground floor. Many victims were working in the basement and could not escape the fire.

At least 50 people were injured in the fire and were treated at the Goa Medical College hospital. By 8 December, only six were reported to be seriously injured, and were in stable condition.

== Investigation ==
Pramod Sawant, the chief minister of Goa, set up a committee to lead the investigation. The investigators visited the site to collect evidence to determine the cause of the fire and remained there until late afternoon on 8 December. Initial investigation revealed that the club had been built violating regulations, did not follow necessary fire safety precautions and was operating without mandatory permissions.

The Goa Police registered a first information report and initiated legal proceeding against the owners of the club. The police arrested four people of the management of the club in connection with the case. The police also detained the sarpanch of the Arpora–Nagoa gram panchayat, Roshan Redkar, for questioning, who later obtained an interim relief from the local court against his arrest. Ajay Gupta, a business partner in the club, was arrested in Delhi. Saurabh and Gaurav Luthra, the owners of the club chain, were later found to have fled to Phuket, Thailand. On 11 December, they were detained in Thailand, and preparations were made for their deportation to India. They made a transit anticipatory bail plea before a court in Rohini, Delhi, which was denied.

In March 2026, a court in Mapusa, North Goa granted bail to Ajay Gupta, one of the co-owners of the ‘Birch by Romeo Lane’ nightclub. He was released on a surety of ₹50,000 with conditions including surrendering his passport and not leaving the country without court permission.

== Reactions ==
Chief Minister Pramod Sawant visited the site of the fire the next day, and stated that the club had several legal violations and that those who responsible would be punished. He pledged ₹0.5 million (US$5,200) for the relatives of the dead and ₹50,000 (US$520) for the injured.

The state government also ordered a fire safety audit for all other nightclubs in the area. The investigation was expected to include scrutiny of emergency exits, ventilation, and structural compliance, and was expected to take a week. The other clubs owned by Romeo Lane were also closed after fire safety violations were found. As of 14 December 2025, two other nightclubs not owned by Romeo Lane were shut down, both in Vagator Beach: Goya Club, illegally built on agricultural land, and Cafe CO2 Goa, which lacked a No Objection Certificate from the fire service and was structurally unsound. The Mumbai Fire Brigade also announced a week-long inspection drive of entertainment venues to ensure compliance with fire-safety regulation.

The North Goa district administration issued a ban on the use of pyrotechnics, fireworks, and sparklers inside "tourist establishments", defined as "nightclubs, bars and restaurants, hotels, guesthouses, resorts, beach shacks, temporary structures, event venues and entertainment establishments".

Droupadi Murmu, the Indian president, expressed her condolences, saying that she was "deeply pained" by the fire and wished for a fast recovery for the victims. Narendra Modi, the Indian prime minister, said that the incident was "deeply saddening", and announced an ex gratia payment of ₹0.2 million (US$2,100) for the families of the deceased and ₹50,000 (US$520) for the injured from the Prime Minister's National Relief Fund. Condolences were also expressed by Amit Shah, the union home minister; Piyush Goyal, the union minister of commerce; and Devendra Fadnavis, the chief minister of Maharashtra.

== See also ==
- List of nightclub fires
