= 2024 Rama II Road crane collapse =

November 2024 disaster in Thailand

- Date: 29 November 2024
- Deaths: 6
- Injuries: 8

On 29 November 2024, a crane and concrete slab constructing the Motorway No. 82 elevated expressway collapsed onto Rama II Road in Samut Sakhon province, Thailand, killing 6 construction workers. Eight workers were injured.

== Background ==
The accident is among several, including multiple previous crane collapses, involving the elevated expressway above Rama II Road.

== See also ==
- 2025 Rama III–Dao Khanong Expressway collapse
