= Trakul Totham =

Thai politician

Acting Second Lieutenant Trakul Totham
- ตระกูล โทธรรม

Governor of Narathiwat Province
- Incumbent
- Assumed office 19 December 2023

Personal details
- Born: Trang Province, Thailand

Trakul Totham (Thai: ตระกูล โทธรรม) is a Thai servant, serving as Governor of Narathiwat Province. Trakul was appointed on 19 December 2023.

== Career ==
Trakul oversaw the response to the 2024 Southern Thailand floods in Narathiwat province. He previously served as chief of Disaster Prevention and Mitigation Regional Center 18 Phuket, leading fire suppression efforts following the 2013 SuperCheap fire.
