= List of earthquakes in Thailand =

This is a list of earthquakes in Thailand:

== Earthquakes ==
| Date (UTC) | Location | Mag. | MMI | Deaths | Injuries | Comments |
|---|---|---|---|---|---|---|
| 460-07-22 | - | - | XII | "Many" | - | A village was submerged and a lake was created. |
| 564-06-07 | - | - | VIII | - | - | Four pagodas collapsed. |
| 1568-07-09 | Chiang Mai | - | VII | - | - | An 86-meter-high pagoda was damaged. |
| 1575-07-06 | Chiang Saen | - | VII | - | - | Temples and pagodas in four districts were destroyed. |
| 1839-03-23 | Myanmar | 8.0+ | V | - | - | Felt in Bangkok. MMI XI in Myanmar. More than 400 fatalities. |
| 1922-05-02 | Shan (Myanmar) | 6.7 | - | - | - | M_{s} |
| 1925-12-23 | Khon Kaen | 5.6 | VII–VIII | - | - | M_{w}. Significant damage. |
| 1935-05-13 | Sainyabuli (Laos) | 6.3 | - | - | - | M_{s} |
| 1975-02-17 | Tak (Myanmar border) | 6.0 | V–VI | - | "Several" | M_{w}. Some damage and some people injured in Bangkok. |
| 1978-05-25 | Chiang Mai | 4.8 | V | - | - | mb. Some damage in Phrao. |
| 1983-04-22 | Kanchanaburi | 5.7 | VII | - | - | M_{w}. Some damage in Bangkok, Kanchanaburi, and Nakhon Phanom. Reservoir-induced earthquake. |
| 1983-04-22 | Kanchanaburi | 5.2 | V–VI | - | - | M_{w}. Aftershock. |
| 1988-11-06 | Yunnan (Myanmar–China border) | 7.6 & 7.2 | V–VI | - | - | M_{s}. Some damage in Chiang Rai. Felt by people in tall buildings in Bangkok. More than 700 killed in China. Two mainshocks separated by 13 minutes; MMI IX and X respectively. |
| 1989-09-30 | Shan (Myanmar–Thailand border) | 5.8 | VI | - | - | M_{w}. Some damage in Chiang Mai. |
| 2006-12-12 | Chiang Mai | 4.6 | IV | - | - | mb. Five buildings damaged. |
| 2007-05-16 | Bokeo (Laos) | 6.3 | VIII | - | - | M_{w}. Some buildings in Chiang Rai and Chiang Saen sustained minor damage. |
| 2011-03-24 | Shan (Myanmar) | 6.8 | VI | 1 | - | M_{w}. One person in Mae Sai killed. MMI IX in Myanmar. At least 74 fatalities in total. |
| 2014-05-05 | Chiang Rai | 6.1 | VIII | 1 | 23 | M_{w}. An elderly person died of a heart attack and 23 people were injured. Damage to buildings and roads. |
| 2019-02-20 | Lampang | 4.6 | VI | - | - | M_{w}. Damage to at least 15 buildings, including a pagoda. |
| 2019-11-20 | Sainyabuli (Laos) | 6.2 | VII | - | - | M_{w}. Damage to some buildings and two people injured in Laos. Several buildings damaged in Bo Kluea and Chaloem Phra Kiat. |
| 2025-03-28 | Sagaing, (Myanmar) | 7.7 | X | 103 | 36 | Strongest earthquake felt in Thailand since 2016; caused the collapse of a 33-story building under construction in Bangkok, trapping scores of workers. |
Note: Only damaging, injurious, or deadly events should be recorded.

=== Tsunamis affecting Thailand ===
- 1941 Andaman Islands earthquake – magnitude 7.7 earthquake, severe damage and unknown fatalities.
- 2004 Indian Ocean earthquake – magnitude 9.1 earthquake, extensive damage, more than 5,400 people killed and many missing.
- 2009 Andaman Islands earthquake – magnitude 7.5 earthquake, tsunami warning issued, no injuries or fatalities anywhere.
- 2012 Indian Ocean earthquake – magnitude 8.6 earthquake, tsunami warning issued, none fatalities.
