= 2025 Rama III–Dao Khanong Expressway collapse =

Bridge collapse in Bangkok, Thailand

- Date: 15 March 2025
- Deaths: 7

On 15 March 2025, a segment of the Rama III–Dao Khanong Expressway collapsed onto Rama II Road in Bangkok, Thailand, killing 7 and injuring 27. The segment was under construction by a joint venture including Italian-Thai Development (ITD), a Bangkok-based construction company. The collapse was attributed to human error.

== Background ==
The construction of the elevated expressway had begun in 2022 and was expected to be completed in June 2025.

== See also ==
- 2024 Rama II Road crane collapse
- Rama II Road
