= Arpora =

- Village
- Location in Goa, India Arpora (India)
- Coordinates: 15°34′0″N 73°46′0″E
- Country: India
- State: Goa

Languages
  - Official: Konkani
- Time zone: UTC+5:30 (IST)
- Vehicle registration: GA
- Website: goa.gov.in

Arpora is a coastal village close to the North Goa beach belt.

== Role in the traditional salt industry ==
Traditionally, it has been a coastal village, known for its traditional salt-making industry. This aspect of the village has been studied in a book, As Dear as Salt, which studies four traditional salt-making villages of Goa (including Arpora).

== Night market ==
In recent times, it is more known for its night market, "The Saturday Night Market". This is open during the fair-weather tourist season (around September to March). Items sold range from musical mouth harps or varieties of food. It also has live musical performances.

== History ==
Arpora is known for St Joseph's, a school that was the first in Goa to offer education in the English language. It was set up by William Robert Lyons, a British priest who inculcated sports into the curriculum, introducing Goans to football in 1883.

On 6 December 2025, a fire at a nightclub in Arpora killed 25 people.
