= 2014 Mae Lao earthquake =

Earthquake in Thailand

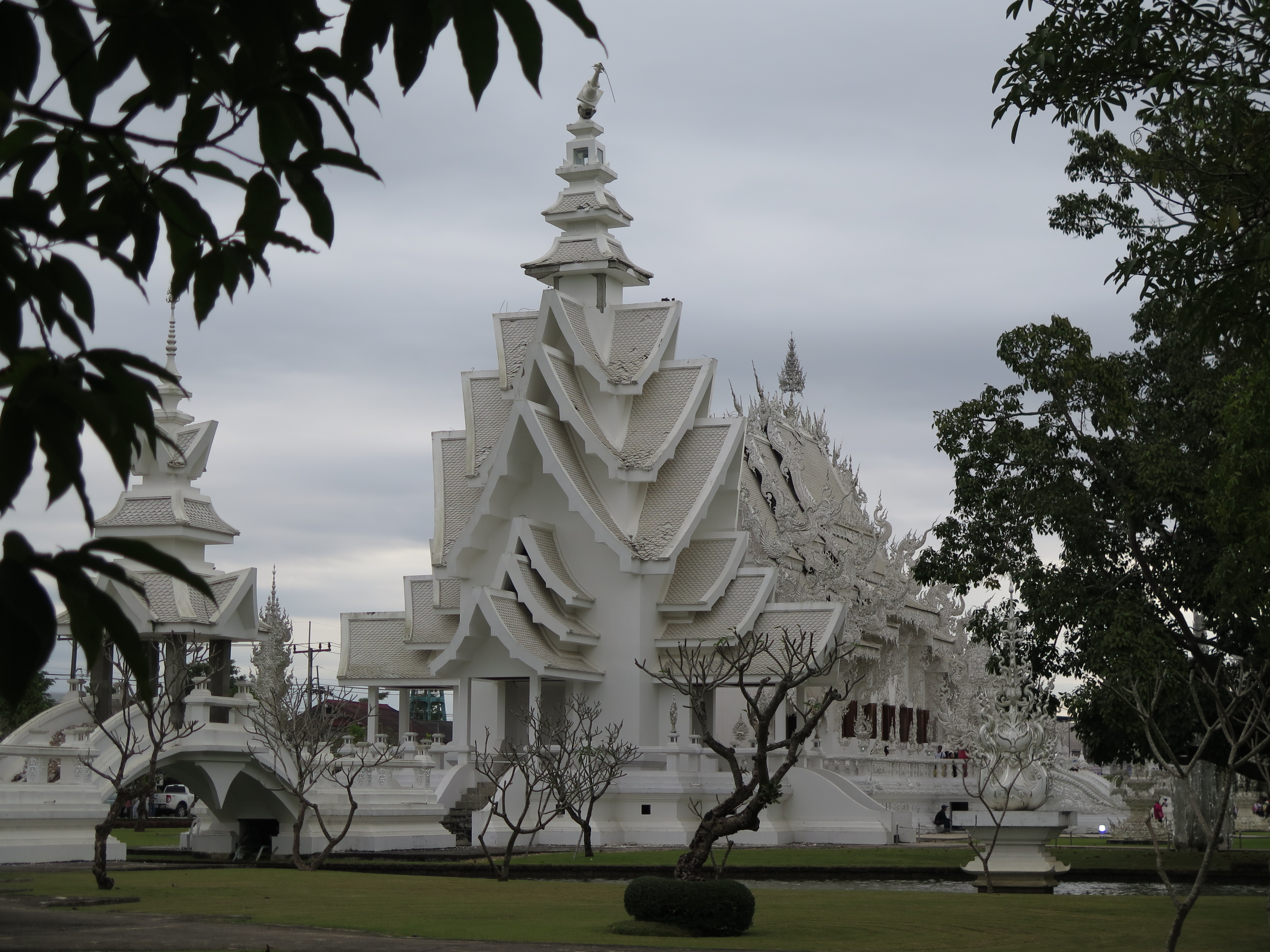
- The damaged Wat Rong Khun, a major attraction in Mueang, Chiang Rai; The broken spire could be observed

- Location within Thailand
- UTC time: 2014-05-05 11:08:43
- ISC event: 604514202
- USGS-ANSS: ComCat
- Local date: May 5, 2014
- Local time: 18:08:43 ICT (UTC+7)
- Magnitude: 6.1 M_{w} (USGS)
- Depth: 7.4 km (5 mi)
- Epicenter: 19.66°N 99.67°E
- Areas affected: Thailand
- Total damage: US$61.8 million
- Max. intensity: MMI VIII (Severe)
- Aftershocks: 274
- Casualties: 1 dead, 23 injured

The 2014 Mae Lao earthquake occurred at 18:08:43 Indochina Time on May 5. The epicenter was located at a point 9 km (6 mi) south of Mae Lao District, 27 km (17 mi) southwest of Chiang Rai, Thailand. One person was killed as a result.

== Effects ==
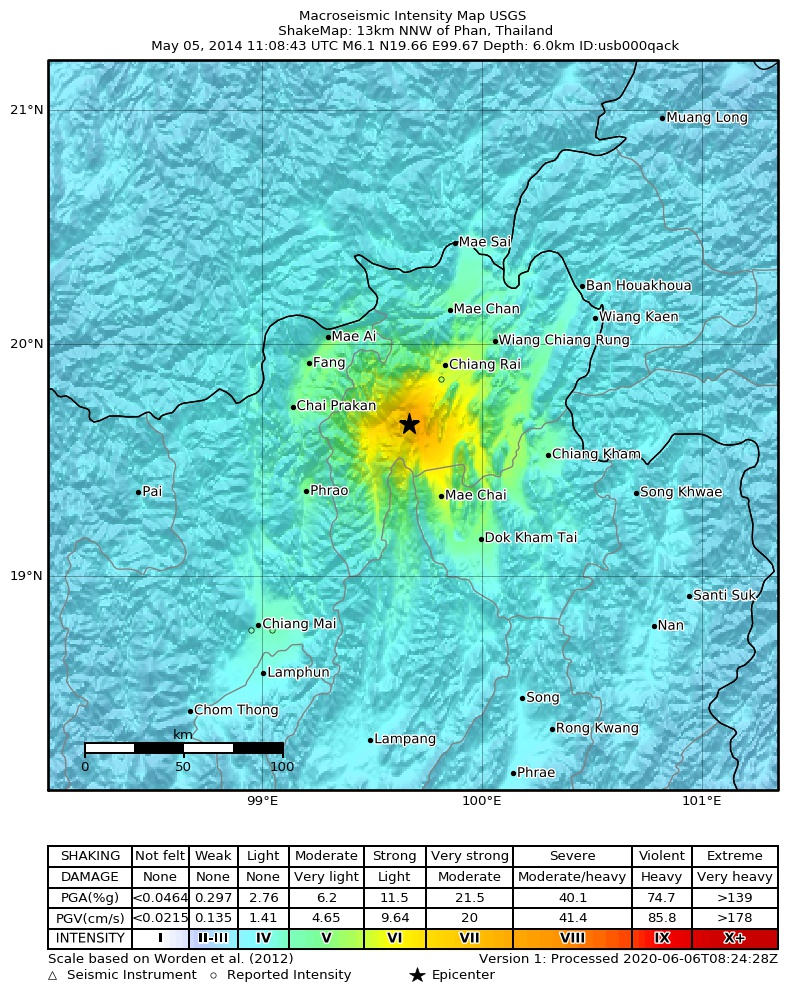
USGS ShakeMap for the event

The earthquake was a recorded as having a maximum intensity of very strong (MMI VIII), shaking both northern Thailand and Myanmar in the evening. People in many northern provinces (including Chiang Rai, Chiang Mai, and Lampang) sensed the quake. Windows, walls and roads as well as temples all suffered damage from the quake. Originally no casualties were reported, but later there were news reports of one death and several injuries. It was the strongest earthquake ever recorded in Thailand according to National Disaster Warning Center Director Somsak Khaosuwan.

Chiang Rai International Airport, located near the epicenter, immediately evacuated people from its terminal. Airport general manager Damrong Klongakara said the runway and flights had not been affected by the quake. Even so, the airport was closed for a while.

In Phan district of Chiang Rai, a road was split by serious cracks. A Buddha statue's head at the Udomwaree Temple fell off due to the quake and a residential building of the temple suffered exterior cracks and ceiling damage.

A Chiang Rai police officer reported that goods in shops were scattered, cracks appeared in buildings, and some provincial roads proved to have "large cracks".

In Bangkok, tall buildings swayed as the earthquake occurred. Tremors were felt as far away as in Yangon, Myanmar.

An economist estimated the damage of this earthquake to be 2 billion baht (US$61.8 million).

== See also ==
- List of earthquakes in 2014
- List of earthquakes in Thailand
