= Chotnarin Kerdsom =

Thai civil servant

- โชตินรินทร์ เกิดสม

Governor of Songkhla Province
- Incumbent
- Assumed office 17 November 2024

Personal details
- Born: 1968 (age 57–58)

Chotnarin Kerdsom (Thai: โชตินรินทร์ เกิดสม, born 1968) is a Thai civil servant, serving as the Governor of Phuket Province.

== Early life and education ==
Chotnarin was born in Nakhon Sri Thammarat Province. He graduated with a bachelor's in economics and a masters of public administration from Maejo University.

== Career ==
Chotnarin served as Deputy Permanent Secretary of Ministry of Interior, where he oversaw Thailand's response to traffic deaths as part of the Disaster Prevention and Mitigation Department's Road Safety Centre.

In November 2024, Chotnarin became governor of Songkhla Province. He was immediately faced with the 2024 Southern Thailand floods, for which he signed a disaster declaration for all 16 of Songkhla's districts. On 29 June 2026, he became Governor of Phuket Province. The appointment was due to the former governor Nirat Pongsitthithavorn who allegedly had conflicts with the Phuket government officials. Prime Minister Anutin Charnvirakul ordered thwarting swapping of positions between Chotnarin and Nirat.
