= Saint-Laurent-du-Pont =

- Commune
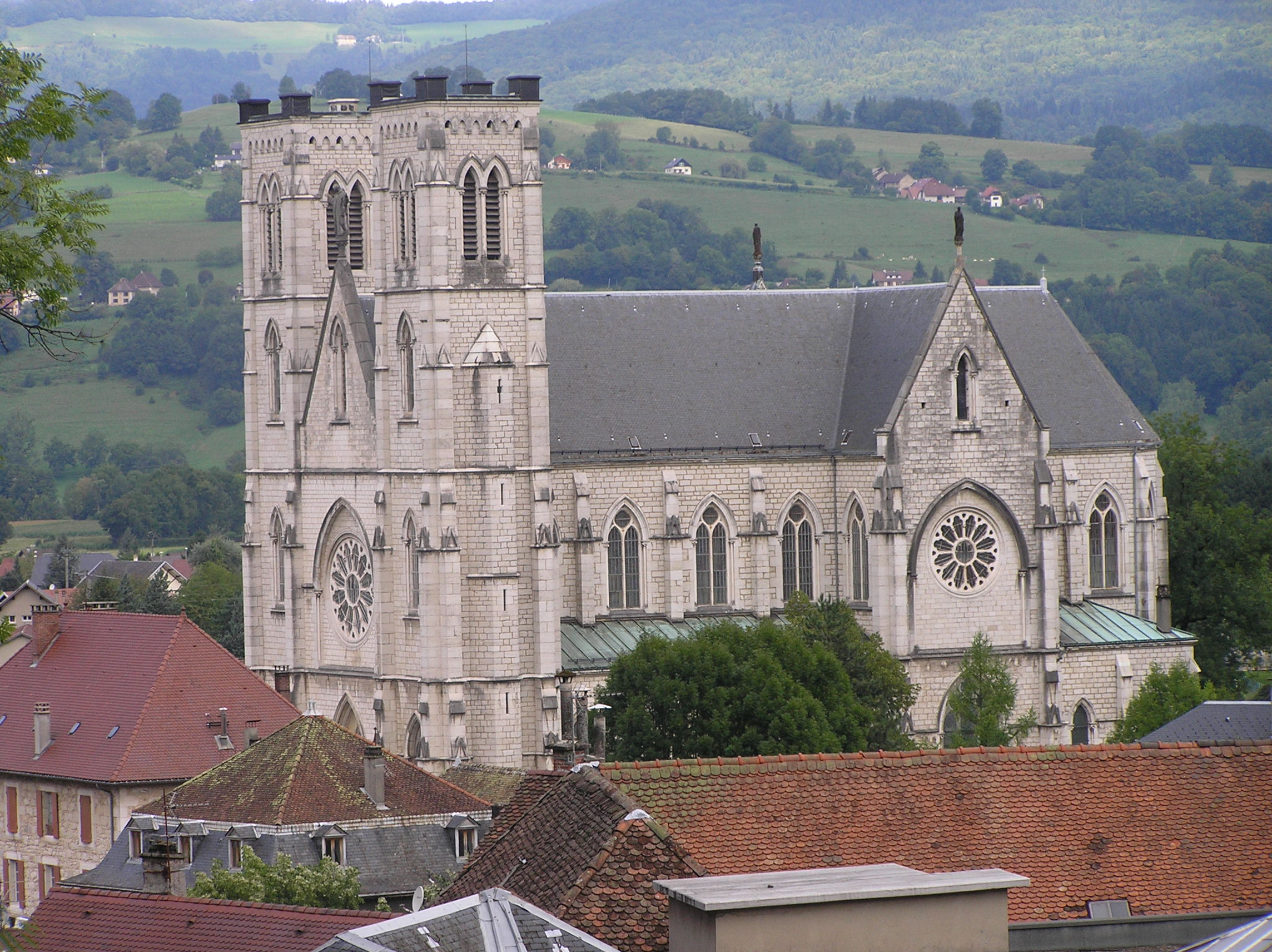
- The church of Saint-Bruno

- Coat of arms
- Location of Saint-Laurent-du-Pont
- Location within France Location within Auvergne-Rhône-Alpes
- Coordinates: 45°23′05″N 5°44′06″E
- Country: France
- Region: Auvergne-Rhône-Alpes
- Department: Isère
- Arrondissement: Grenoble
- Canton: Chartreuse-Guiers
- Intercommunality: CC Cœur de Chartreuse

Government
  - Mayor (2024–2026): Céline Boursier
- Area^{1}: 35.20 km^{2} (13.59 sq mi)
- Elevation: 400 m (1,300 ft)
- Highest elevation: 1,735 m (5,692 ft)
- Lowest elevation: 379 m (1,243 ft)
- Population (2023): 4,490
  - Density: 128/km^{2} (330/sq mi)
- Time zone: UTC+01:00 (CET)
  - Summer (DST): UTC+02:00 (CEST)
- INSEE/Postal code: 38412 /38380
- ^{1} French Land Register data, which excludes lakes, ponds, glaciers > 1 km^{2} (0.386 sq mi or 247 acres) and river estuaries.

Saint-Laurent-du-Pont (French pronunciation: [sɛ̃ loʁɑ̃ dy pɔ̃]) is a commune in the Isère department in southeastern France. In 1970 it was the location of the Club Cinq-Sept fire, in which 146 people died.

== Population ==
Historical population

Year	Pop.	±% p.a.
1793	2,159	—
1821	2,844	+0.99%
1846	1,886	−1.63%
1872	1,808	−0.16%
1901	2,842	+1.57%
1926	2,749	−0.13%
1946	2,825	+0.14%
1962	3,305	+0.99%
1968	3,761	+2.18%

Year	Pop.	±% p.a.
1975	3,709	−0.20%
1982	4,125	+1.53%
1990	4,061	−0.20%
1999	4,222	+0.43%
2007	4,519	+0.85%
2012	4,526	+0.03%
2017	4,531	+0.02%
2023	4,490	−0.15%

Source: EHESS and INSEE (1968-2023)

== Economy ==
There is a large cement works at Saint-Laurent-du-Pont, unusually inside a national park.

== Twin towns – sister cities ==
Saint-Laurent-du-Pont is twinned with:

- Herdorf, Germany (1984)
- Berbenno, Italy (1985)

== See also ==
- Communes of the Isère department
