= Study Club fire =

1929 fatal dance-hall fire, Michigan

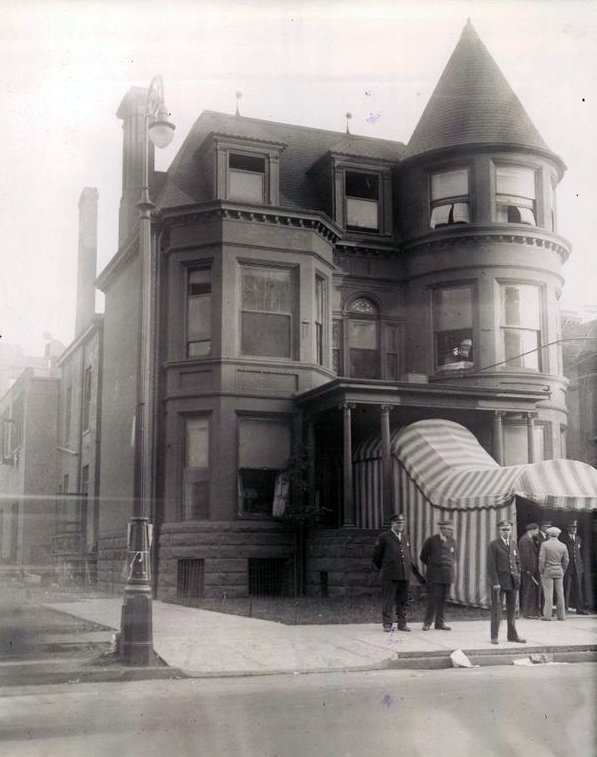
- The Study Club photographed the day after the fire
- Location of the Study Club
- Date: September 20, 1929
- Venue: Study Nightclub
- Location: Detroit, Michigan; 42°20′25.2″N 83°03′06.9″W
- Type: Fire
- Cause: discarded cigarette
- Deaths: 22
- Injuries: 55

The Study Club fire killed 22 people and injured over 50 in a Detroit, Michigan, dance hall on September 20, 1929.

The club was located in the old theater district, at 65 East Vernor Highway, in Detroit. Until the fire, the Study Club operated as a speakeasy nightclub, where alcohol was being illegally sold during Prohibition. The fire is a historic case study of disasters in nightclubs, specifically dealing with hazards of flammable materials.

== Prohibition ==
The Study night club was not a typical nightclub by modern standards. It consisted of three floors of varied usage and was constructed from a three-story retrofitted mansion. The first floor was a kitchen, and the second floor was a restaurant and dance floor. During the 1920s and early 1930s, Prohibition banned the sale, transportation, and distribution of alcohol in the US. The Study Club was widely known to serve alcohol illegally. The Study Club operated under the principle that everything was fixed (which implied law enforcement non-interference with the selling of alcohol). Police officers were indeed consistent club patrons and allowed the club to operate in illegal premises.

== Fire ==
The fire occurred on September 20, 1929. The official cause of the fire was not determined. It is assumed the fire was caused by a discarded cigarette in the stairwell, which was lined with flammable draperies and decorations, that led to the second floor. The owner of the building believed the fire to be the result of a bomb. The stairwell was the only means of egress for the second-floor patrons. Over 20 people were killed and 55 injured.

Some patrons managed to find their way to the roof and escaped by jumping from the building, many of them suffering broken legs. Bandleader Al Handler helped get several people out a second-floor window, then followed. Others seeking safety fled to dressing rooms in the building and were found there after the fire. It was reported by survivors that some patrons thought the fire was part of the dancing act.

Most windows were blocked with boards and were inaccessible even to firefighters. The majority of those who died were in their 30s. Most deaths were attributed to suffocation and asphyxiation from toxic fumes emitted from the burning debris, rather than the actual heat from the flames. After the fire, the building's interior was completely destroyed while the exterior appeared undamaged apart from broken windows. The fire escape along the side of the structure was apparently inaccessible and proved useless to trapped patrons. Some estimates reported financial losses to be over US$35,000 (~US$598,000 in 2022).

== Aftermath ==
With several more severe fires subsequent to this, the Study nightclub fire has largely gone unreported in peer-assessed literature, with the exception that it serves to illustrate fires caused by flammable materials such as decorations. The National Fire Protection Association (NFPA) considers the fire and loss of life significant in its list of historic fires.
