= Sungai Kolok fireworks disaster =

Fireworks explosion in Sungai Kolok, Thailand

- Date: 29 July 2023; 3 years ago
- Location: Sungai Kolok, Thailand
- Type: Fireworks disaster
- Deaths: 12+
- Injuries: 118+ (13 seriously)
- Property damage: 200+ homes/businesses destroyed

The Sungai Kolok fireworks disaster was a catastrophic fireworks explosion that occurred at a warehouse on 29 July 2023 in Sungai Kolok, Thailand, killing at least 12 and injuring at least 118, and destroying at least 200 homes and businesses.
