= Technical Standards and Safety Authority =

- Abbreviation: TSSA
- Formation: 1997
- Type: Regulatory authority
- Headquarters: Toronto, Ontario, Canada
- Region served: Ontario
- President and CEO: Bonnie Rose
- Staff: 420 (2020)
- Website: www.tssa.org

The Technical Standards and Safety Authority (TSSA) is a regulatory authority that administers and enforces technical standards in the province of Ontario in Canada.

It is a nonprofit organization that has been given powers by the Government of Ontario to create and enforce public safety rules in such areas as elevators, ski lifts, amusement rides, fuels, boilers, pressure vessels and operating engineers in order to protect lives and the environment.

== See also ==
- Canadian Standards Association
- Technical Safety Authority of Saskatchewan
