= Mountain B nightclub fire =

2022 disaster in Thailand

- Date: 5 August 2022
- Time: 01:00 am ICT
- Venue: Mountain B
- Location: Sattahip District, Chonburi Province, Thailand; 12°39′57″N 100°55′41″E
- Type: Fire
- Cause: Under investigation
- Deaths: 26
- Injuries: 22

On 5 August 2022 at 1:00 AM ICT, a fire broke out at Mountain B, a nightclub located on the Sukhumvit Road in Phlu Ta Luang sub-district, Sattahip District, Chonburi Province, Thailand. The fire began at 1 am ICT and caused 13 immediate deaths. Out of the 38 people injured, seven later died in hospital, bringing the total death toll to 20. In October 2022, another victim died in the hospital; she was the 25th death related to the fire.

It was the first disaster of its kind in Sattahip.

== Incident ==
On the night of the fire, the club had performances by DJ ONE & DJ Tiger, and the band Taewnaew popular amongst the locals. At the time of the disaster, 1:00 am ICT, it was reportedly near its closing time and had between 50 and 100 patrons inside. A prior performer at the club told reporters that there was only one exit and entry point for customers at the front of the club, and the back entry point for musicians was locked during performances.

An eyewitness account reported by Sawang Rochana Dharmasthan Foundation's first respondents stating that initial sparks were seen on the roof. Within the next 5 minutes, explosions were heard and fire began to spread quickly. An eyewitness stated that she was near the stage and was alerted to the fire by another attendee who ran in and shouted that the roof was on fire. She stated the fire quickly spread and many attempted to break through a glass wall to escape but were unsuccessful as the glass was too thick. Another eyewitness claimed that the fire began at the top right corner of the stage, and that the band's singer had shouted fire, as did some members of security and the wait staff who helped evacuate attendees. At least one video of the evacuation from the venue was posted to social media, which showed people fleeing from the venue with some individuals' clothing on fire as thick black smoke came from the building.

The fire soon spread all over the building as it was lined with highly inflammable acoustic foam. There was only a single ventilation portal in the entire establishment which further aided the fire to spread. The deceased were found throughout the clubs premises, four were found at the gate, three in the men's restroom, one behind the DJ booth, and five around the cashier.

== Casualties ==
The fire caused 20 deaths with thirteen reported deceased at the club and seven of them later perishing at a local hospital. The victims were aged from 17 to 49-years-old and all were identified as Thai nationals. One of the victims was singer Chatchai Cheunkha who received widespread condolences.

Thirty-eight injured victims were admitted at three hospitals; 27 at Queen Sirikit Hospital, two at Wat Yannasangwararam Hospital, and nine at Sattahip Kilometre 9 Hospital.

== Investigation ==
The building was found to be illegally constructed into a closed space. The club owner was taken to the police station shortly after the fire to make statements about the events and the condition of the venue. The club owner admitted to the authorities that on the day prior, electricians were hired to work on the electrical system on the ceiling. However, it is not clear whether it is related to the fire. Further investigation found the establishment to contain only three gates; one being the front entrance for the club-goers and was the only available escape route when the fire spread. The other two gates were for staff members and were located on the side and on the back. The latter two gates were hindered when the fire occurred, one being locked and the other being blocked by a fridge. The club was also previously charged on several occasions for making noises and opening over the legally allowed time period.

There have been a widespread news that local police officers were involved in the management of the club and were involved in a possible corruption case that allowed the club to remain open despite many violations. The Royal Thai Police commissioner had launched an investigation into the claim.

== Aftermath ==
Sattahip district sheriff Chatchai Sipho-on and five local police officers were removed from their positions. A cousin of the 17 year-old victim made an appearance on media questioning how a child was even allowed inside the nightclub despite age restriction.

== Response ==
Many netizens pointed out many similarities to the infamous 2009 Santika Club fire in Bangkok's Watthana District which caused 67 deaths and 200+ injured. Online debates sparked around whether nightclub safety regulation has been properly reinforced or improved since. Additionally, many suggested that bribery with local law enforcement is to blame for such loose regulation on safety codes.
