= 2009 Bangkok nightclub fire =

Fire in Bangkok, Thailand

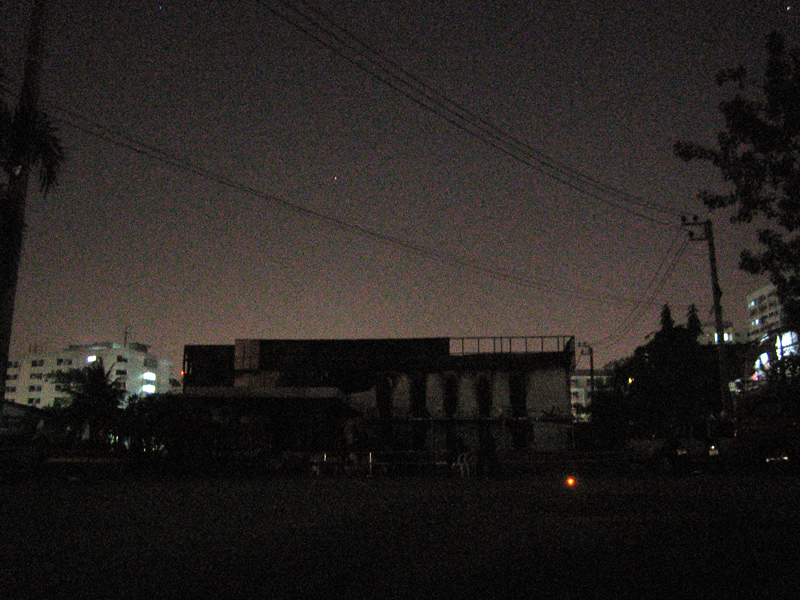
- Ruins of the Santika nightclub, photographed three days after the event, on 4 January 2009
- Date: 1 January 2009; 17 years ago
- Venue: Santika nightclub
- Location: Bangkok, Thailand; 13°43′57″N 100°35′12″E
- Type: Fire
- Cause: Fireworks accident and/or electrical explosion
- Deaths: 67
- Injuries: 222

On 1 January 2009, a fireworks accident and nightclub fire occurred at the Santika Club on Ekkamai Road in Bangkok, Thailand, where New Year's celebrations were taking place. The fire killed 67 people and injured another 222 when it swept through the club during the New Year's celebration as the band "Burn" was playing.

The fire broke out at 00:35, and citizens of thirteen countries were among the injured.

== Fire ==
No official cause for the Santika fire has been announced by investigators. Suggested causes include outdoor fireworks that set the roof on fire, sparklers lighted inside the nightclub, or an electrical explosion. One witness stated there were no pyrotechnics in the club, while another reported seeing flames on the roof after going outside to watch the midnight fireworks display.

Video recordings of the indoor stage event, including the countdown to midnight, show that only ordinary holiday sparklers were used. Moreover, the fire became visible indoors approximately 10 minutes after midnight. This strongly suggests the fire originated inside the ceiling space or on the roof, allowing it to grow in intensity while going unnoticed for some time. Due to the lax enforcement of building regulations, tar paper and plastic are often used as waterproofing materials. Santika only had one main exit, with an additional private staff exit. A third exit was locked to prevent robberies.

== Victims ==
Around 1,000 guests and employees were in the club when it burned, and deaths occurred from smoke inhalation, burns and being crushed during a stampede for the exit. Doctors stated that fumes from burning plastic could have caused people to faint after a few minutes.

The injured were taken to 19 hospitals, with most taken to Bangkok Hospital. More than 100 other people were injured in this incident. Only 29 of the 61 bodies were immediately identified, of these 28 were Thais and the other a Singaporean. The bodies of those who died were wrapped in white cloth and placed in the club's car park pending removal. It took up to a week to identify the others because of extensive burns to their bodies.

== Criminal proceedings ==
Pongsak Kasemsan, an official in Bangkok, ordered a preliminary investigation, with results by 4 January. After a preliminary inspection of the club's safety system, it was declared "substandard" by police Lieut. Gen. Jongrak Jutanont. It was revealed the club only had one fire extinguisher, and that the nightclub was registered as a food vendor (restaurant), meaning it was required by law to close at midnight. Prime Minister Abhisit Vejjajiva visited the site and said, "The question is why they let someone take fireworks inside the pub and light them up."

Two parallel investigations were launched, one by the police, and one by the Ministry of Justice. The police blamed the lead singer of "Burn" for setting off fireworks on stage, and the club owner for recklessness and for illegally admitting people under the age of 19. The Ministry of Justice investigation discovered the nightclub was officially registered as a private residence and therefore had never received a fire safety inspection. It was also in a zone where nightclubs are prohibited and the city architect's signature approving the club's design had been forged. Between 2004 and 2006, police had filed 47 charges against the club's owners for illegal operation. After that, however, no charges were filed. Suspicions of corruption were raised when one of the co-owners was identified as a senior police officer. When the Ministry of Justice investigation was turned over to the police, sources close to the minister reported he was furious.

The owner of the Santika Club was charged, along with twelve other directors. The owner was also charged with allowing an underage customer into the club after a 17-year-old student's body was recovered. He faced a further charge of carelessness resulting in death.

On 20 September 2011, the Southern Bangkok Criminal Court found two persons – Wisuk Setsawat, the pub owner, and Boonchu Laorinath, the responsible person for pyrotechnics – guilty of negligence. Wisuk and Boonchoo were given three-year jail terms. Boonchoo was also ordered to pay 8.5 million baht in compensation to five plaintiffs, relatives of the victims.

On 22 October 2013, the Court of Appeals acquitted Setsawat of gross negligence. On 25 April 2014, the Southern Bangkok Criminal Court found Setsawat guilty of excise tax violations and sentenced him to one year in prison.

In November 2015, Setsawat was sentenced to three years in prison by the Supreme Court after being found guilty of a careless act resulting in the deaths and injuries of multiple people. In March 2018, Setsawat was sentenced to seven additional months in prison by the Supreme Court after he was found guilty of failing to pay ฿85 million in tax while he owned Santika Club.

== In popular culture ==
- Modernine TV discussed the Santika Club fire in the TimeLine on 30 March 2015 titled "Countdown Death Santika".

== See also ==
- List of fireworks accidents and incidents
- List of nightclub fires
