= Bright Sparklers fireworks disaster =

1991 explosion in Sungai Buloh, Malaysia

- Date: 7 May 1991; 35 years ago
- Time: 3:45 pm MST
- Location: Sungai Buloh, Selangor, Malaysia; 3°11′57″N 101°33′43″E
- Also known as: Hiroshima of Sungai Buloh
- Cause: Explosion triggered by spilled explosive chemicals during fireworks testing
- Deaths: 26
- Injuries: 103 (Note: Some sources report 83 injuries.)
- Property damage: MYR 1 million, 46 homes destroyed, 149 damaged
- Litigation: 118 families filed lawsuits, settled in 2006

On 7 May 1991 at 3:45 pm MST in Sungai Buloh, Selangor, Malaysia, a massive explosion at the Bright Sparklers fireworks factory caused 26 deaths, 103 injuries, and the destruction of 46 homes, damaging 149 others. The blast, audible 7–8 km away, was nicknamed the "Hiroshima of Sungai Buloh" by local media due to its devastating impact. (Note: The nickname "Hiroshima of Sungai Buloh" was used by media to compare the explosion's devastation to the atomic bombing of Hiroshima during World War II.) The disaster led to significant regulatory changes, including the temporary closure of fireworks factories and the passage of the Occupational Safety and Health Act 1994.

== Background ==
Bright Sparklers Sdn. Bhd., established on 26 November 1973 and operational since 1 April 1974, was located in a rural area 30 km from Sungai Buloh's population center. It has ceased operations. The factory imported, exported, and manufactured fireworks, including hand-held sparklers, Roman candles, fountains, and rockets. It exported significant quantities to the United Kingdom and Europe, with RM 1.57 million in exports between January and April 1991. The facility was insured against fire for RM 1.5 million, with the manager holding a RM 50,000 personal accident policy.

The factory operated illegally without a valid manufacturing license since 1978, lacked permits for storing explosives, and employed underage workers, violating Malaysian labor laws. It was not built to safety specifications, and raw materials and finished products were stored unsafely on-site. Ownership included a Hong Kong-based company, 10 Malaysian individuals, local private companies, and Singaporean stakeholders.

== Explosion and fire ==
On 7 May 1991, at 3:45 pm, an explosion occurred at the Bright Sparklers factory, triggered by a Hong Kong chemist's negligence during fireworks testing in the factory canteen. Explosive chemicals spilled, igniting a fire that spread to a nearby pile of large firecrackers ("bazookas"), causing a chain reaction. A second explosion followed 10 minutes later, and a third, the most powerful, occurred at 4:00 pm, felt 4 km away. Over 20 explosions ensued, with smoke visible 8 km away.

The blasts destroyed the factory and nearby Kampung Baru Sungai Buloh, collapsing homes, shattering windows up to 7 km away in Seri Menjalara and Selayang, and damaging adjacent factories. Vehicles, including cars and motorcycles, were destroyed, and the nearby Sungai Buloh Military Camp was affected. Workers fled, but many were injured or killed by debris, heat, or collapsing structures.

Firefighters faced challenges due to low water pressure, distant hydrants, rapid fire spread, and ongoing explosions. Nine ambulances from Kuala Lumpur Hospital and University of Malaya Medical Centre transported victims, with civilians using trucks and vans to assist. Toxic gas from chemical reactions during cleanup posed health risks, affecting over 50 rescuers with breathing difficulties and skin irritation.

== Aftermath ==
The disaster left 26 dead, 103 injured, and 260 people displaced. 46 homes were destroyed, and 149 others were damaged. Two Bright Sparklers subsidiaries in Rawang and Hulu Langat were closed.

The Selangor state government established the Sungai Buloh Fire Relief Fund with an initial RM 10,000, raising RM 833,538.45 by 1 June 1991. The Malaysian Red Crescent Society set up a relief center at Bukit Komuniti Sungai Buloh. PERKESO provided compensation to victims' families, despite incomplete employee records, covering 84 claims, including 59 for temporary disability.

Cleanup efforts, including "Operasi Api Buluh" on 16 May, uncovered underground explosive stores, two of which had exploded, leaving 6-meter-deep craters. Toxic gas persisted, with seven rescuers fainting and residents reporting foul odors.

== Investigation and government response ==
A Royal Commission of Inquiry (RCI) investigated the disaster, finding that Bright Sparklers violated regulations by operating on agricultural land, lacking manufacturing and explosives licenses, and employing underage workers. The fire originated in the laboratory during fireworks testing. The Ministry of Human Resources investigated underage employment, and the Department of Environment tested air toxicity, finding no health risks, though rescuers reported illnesses.

The disaster prompted the temporary closure of all fireworks factories in Malaysia and the establishment of the HAZMAT unit in 1992. The Occupational Safety and Health Act 1994 was passed to improve workplace safety. Prime Minister Mahathir Mohamad called for a review of hazardous industries.

In 2006, 118 families settled lawsuits against the government and factory owner for RM 30,000 in property damages. The Royal Malaysia Police considered legal action against the factory owners for storing explosives without permits.

== Memorial ==
In 1998, a Chinese pavilion-style memorial was erected near the site, close to Kampung Selamat MRT station. It features three memorial stones inscribed in Malay, Chinese, and Tamil, commemorating the victims.

== In popular culture ==
On 30 May 2012, TV3's documentary series Detik Tragik aired an episode titled "Hiroshima Sungai Buloh", featuring interviews with survivors and firefighters involved in the disaster.

== See also ==
- Culemborg fireworks disaster
- Enschede fireworks disaster
- Seest fireworks disaster
- Tangerang fireworks disaster
- Sungai Kolok fireworks disaster
- 2015 Tianjin explosions
- 2020 Beirut explosion
- List of fires
- List of industrial disasters
