= OSH =

Osh is a city in Kyrgyzstan. Osh or OSH may also refer to:

- Osh (food), in Tajik and Uzbek cuisines
- Osh (singer) (born 1995), English singer and rapper
- OSH, the IATA code for Wittman Regional Airport near Oshkosh, Wisconsin, United States

== As an acronym ==
=== Places ===
- Old State House (disambiguation)
- Old Swinford Hospital, a school in Stourbridge, United Kingdom
- Oregon State Hospital, in Salem, Oregon, United States
- Osawatomie State Hospital, in Osawatomie, Kansas, United States
- Oshkosh, Wisconsin, United States, nicknamed "Osh"

=== Science and technology ===
- Open-source hardware
- Outside hospital, a medical abbreviation

=== Other uses ===
- Occupational safety and health
- Occupational Safety and Health Act (United States)
  - OSHmail, an electronic newsletter from the European Agency for Safety and Health at Work (EU-OSHA)
- Old Speckled Hen, a beer produced by Greene King Brewery
- Orchard Supply Hardware, an American retailer
- Ordo Sancti Hieronymi, a religious order

== See also ==
- OSHA (disambiguation)
