= Tangerang fireworks disaster =

2017 industrial accident in Indonesia

Coordinates: 6.079627°S 106.678198°E

2017 Tangerang fireworks disaster
- Date: 26 October 2017; 8 years ago
- Time: 09:00 - 13:00 WIB (02:00 UTC)
- Duration: At least 3 hours
- Venue: PT. Panca Buana Cahaya Sukses
- Location: Kosambi, Tangerang Regency, Banten, Indonesia
- Type: Fireworks accident
- Cause: Gunpowder explosion due to welding spark
- Deaths: 49
- Injuries: 46

The Tangerang fireworks disaster occurred on 26 October 2017 at the PT. Panca Buana Cahaya Sukses, a fireworks manufacturing factory in Kosambi, Tangerang, Indonesia. The explosion occurred in a warehouse connected to the factory and ignited a large fire. A total of 103 people were working at the factory at the time of the explosion. At least 49 people were killed and 46 others were injured in the fireworks accident. Authorities confirmed that several people were still missing. It was the deadliest industrial accident in Indonesia.

An initial investigation by the Indonesian National Police suggested that an accidental ignition of gunpowder caused the blast and fire. A later report by the Indonesian National Police stated that workers had been welding near some fireworks, and sparks from the welding caused the explosion.

== Explosion ==
According to eyewitnesses, two explosions occurred at the site of the factory. The first explosion took place around 8:30 a.m. local time. The force of the explosion shook windows that were located at a radius of 4 km from the blast site. The first explosion caused a massive fire inside the factory. The second explosion occurred around three hours later. A reported 103 workers were employed at the factory. The rooftops of the factory were flung due to the force of the explosion. Nearby residents stated that the explosion was similar to a massive bomb. Students at a nearby junior high school reportedly panicked, crying and poured into the street. They were later evacuated by their teachers.

The factory and the storage was not in the same building. However, the explosion ignited a fire and the fire managed to spread to the factory. Eyewitnesses reported that women and teenagers were working at the factory when the explosion occurred. As the fire spread, panicked workers tried to flee from the site. As the fire started in the front part of the factory, factory workers fled to the backside of the factory. Eyewitnesses reportedly heard screams from the victims. Victims were also reportedly heard banging on the doors. Several people managed to get out from the factory in time by going through the flames and climbing the front gate. However, most suffered burn injuries. An eyewitness stated that a woman was on fire while trying to flee from the factory. Several other survivors suffered injuries due to falls.

The Tangerang Fire Brigade dispatched seven fire engines to the scene. At least three ambulances were also dispatched to the disaster site. Bomb squad personnel were also dispatched by the police to secure the area. Police later cordoned off the area. Initial examination of the site suggested that several people had died during the fire and most of them were burnt beyond recognition. According to the police, most of the bodies were concentrated into a single area in the back of the factory. The factory had reportedly been in operation for under two months.

The explosion injured 46 people. Police quickly recovered 23 bodies from the blast site. The death toll was later revised to 39 as police recovered more bodies from the site. As of 27 October, the death toll stood at 47, with dozens of people still unaccounted for. Police later advised people to stay away from the factory and its nearby area. Two people later succumbed to their injuries, bringing the death toll to 49.

== Casualties ==
There were 103 people present during the explosion and fire, and 49 were killed. The death toll includes two people who later died from injuries sustained in the blast. The first victim was identified by the police as 14-year old Surnah. On the following day, the Indonesian National Police managed to identify at least 15 victims of the disaster. Ten people were immediately listed as missing by the police. Seven of them were later found to be safe. The other three were still searched by the police.

== Investigation ==
In response to the disaster, the Indonesian Government formed a special commission to investigate the cause of the fire. According to the Indonesian National Police, the government had issued a legal license for the factory in 2016. In the immediate aftermath of the explosion, the license was frozen by the government. The government later issued an order to evaluate every firework factories in and around Tangerang. The same order was also issued by the Governor of Banten Wahidin Halim.

Initial investigation revealed that according to the license that the factory was holding, the factory was registered as a toy factory instead of a firework factory. This means that the manufacturing of fireworks inside the factory is illegal. This finding could bring charges to the owners of the factory. Further findings revealed that the factory was only allowed to hire only 10 employees instead of 103. There were also child laborers inside the factory. Examination of the victims revealed that several of the dead were teenagers with ages ranging from 14 to 16. Indonesia National Commission of Human Rights also reported that the workers of the factory were underpaid.

Ministry of Manpower and Transmigration investigated the factory for possible violations on the work safety procedures. They were also asked by the Indonesian House of Representatives to immediately visit the disaster site. Minister of Manpower Hanif Dakhiri stated that the ministry had formed a team to investigate possible violations on the work safety procedures.

On 28 October, it was revealed that a spark from welding accidentally sparked the fire. According to the Indonesian National Police, welders Subarna Ega and Husnul were ordered by their boss Andri Hartanto to weld near an area where the fireworks were being laid on the ground. A spark from the welding accidentally contacted the 4,000 kilograms of gunpowder, which immediately exploded into a massive fireball which caused the fire. Husnul managed to flee before the explosion. Subarna Ega was later declared as a suspect by the police. Police suspected that he had died during the explosion.

== See also ==
- List of fireworks accidents and incidents
- Sungai Buloh fireworks disaster, a similar incident happened 26 years prior, in Sungai Buloh in the neighbouring country of Malaysia
- Culemborg fireworks disaster
- Enschede fireworks disaster
- Seest fireworks disaster
- Tangerang prison fire
