= Occupational Health and Safety Act =

Occupational Health and Safety Act may refer to:

- Occupational Health and Safety Act, 1993, South Africa
- Occupational Health and Safety Act 2000, New South Wales (repealed)
- Occupation Safety and Health Act (Kenya), a national law of Kenya
- Occupational Health and Safety Act (Ontario), R.S.O. 1990, c. O.1

== See also ==
- Occupational Safety and Health Act (United States), 1970
- Occupational Safety and Health Act 1994, Malaysia
