= Oshe =

Oshe may refer to:

- Oshé, the double-headed axe of the Yoruba deity, Ṣango

The acronym OSHE may refer to:

- Occupational Safety, Health, and Environment

== See also ==
- Osh, Kyrgyzstan
- OSH (disambiguation)
- Oche (disambiguation)
