= Otia =

Otia or OTIA can refer to:

- Otia (given name), a Georgian masculine given name
- Otia, Kentucky, a rural unincorporated community in Kentucky, U.S.
- Office of Telecommunications and Information Applications, part of the National Telecommunications and Information Administration in the U.S.

== See also ==
- Otia Imperialia, a 13th-century encyclopedia
- Otia de Machomete, a 12th-century poem about Muhammad
- Otis (disambiguation)
- Osha (disambiguation)
- OTA (disambiguation)
