= Château d'Oche =

Château d'Oche can refer to:

- Château d'Oche a mountain in Haute-Savoie, France.
- Château d'Oche a château in Dordogne, France.
