= OSHA (disambiguation) =

OSHA is the Occupational Safety and Health Administration, a federal agency of the United States that regulates workplace safety and health.

OSHA or Osha may also refer to:

== Work ==
- Occupational Safety and Health Act (United States) of 1970, a federal law in the United States, the act that created the Occupational Safety and Health Administration mentioned above
- Occupational Safety and Health Act 1994, a national law of Malaysia
- Occupation Safety and Health Act (Kenya), a national law of Kenya
- European Agency for Safety and Health at Work, an agency of the European Union
- The Division of Occupational Safety and Health (DOSH) of the California Department of Industrial Relations, a California state government agency better known as Cal/OSHA

== Other ==
- Osha River, a river in Russia
- Osha (herb), a perennial herb
- Osha (A Song of Ice and Fire), a character in George R. R. Martin's fictional A Song of Ice and Fire fantasy series
- Osha, characters from the World of Warcraft video games
- Osha Gray Davidson, an American writer and artist

== See also ==
- Occupational Health and Safety Act (disambiguation)
- Usha, Israel, a kibbutz in Israel
- Osho (disambiguation)
