= Oche (disambiguation) =

Oche (/ˈɒki/) is a throw line in the game of darts. Oche may also refer to:

- Château d'Oche (mountain), a mountain in France
- Château d'Oche (Saint-Priest-les-Fougères), a manor house in France
- Dent d'Oche, a mountain in France
- Oches, a commune in northern France
- Ochi (mountain) in Greece
- óchi, transliteration of όχι (pronounced similar to "ohi"), "no" in the Greek language
- O'Che 1867, a family-owned goldsmith and jewellery business in Macau, China
- Uche Sherif (or Oche Sherif), Nigerian football player

== See also ==
- Aachen
