= Representation of the European Commission in Belgium =

Public office in Belgium

The European Commission Representation in Belgium is part of the Commission's network of representative offices throughout the Member States of the European Union. It is located in Brussels, in the Charlemagne building. The Commission has Representations in the capitals of all EU Member States, as well as Regional Offices in Barcelona, Bonn, Marseille, Milan, Munich and Wroclaw. They work closely with the European Parliament Liaison Offices (EPLO) in Member States.

== Function ==
The Representation serves as a link between the Belgian Government, and the European Commission headquarters in Brussels. It informs the public and the media about the policies of the Commission and promotes permanent political dialogue with the national, regional and local authorities, parliaments, social partners, stakeholders, academia and civil society. At the same time, it keeps the European Commission headquarters informed of various political, social and economic developments in Belgium.

=== Head of Representation ===
Thomas de Béthune is the Head of the Representation in Belgium as of September 1, 2024.

== Regional information and advise services ==
The work of the Representations is complemented by a set of relays spread throughout the country. These include:

=== EUROPE DIRECT ===
In Belgium there are 9 EUROPE DIRECT centres. EUROPE DIRECT centres help bring the European Union closer to people on the ground and help facilitate their participation in debates on the future of the EU. The centres answer questions about EU policies, programmes and priorities. Staff in the centres are ready to proactively engage with citizens and stakeholders so that they feel more involved in the European project.

=== European Documentation Centre ===
The 5 European Documentation Centres in Belgium promote teaching and research of questions about the European integration. They provide a selection of documents on European affairs and encourage the academic community to engage in the debate on the future of the EU.

=== Enterprise Europe Network ===
The Enterprise Europe Network (EEN) helps businesses innovate and grow on an international scale. It is the world’s largest support network for small and medium-sized enterprises (SMEs) with international ambitions. The Network is active worldwide. It brings together experts from member organisations that are renowned for their excellence in business support. The Enterprise Europe Network in Belgium has 13 contact points.
