= Opera Australia Orchestra =

Australian orchestra

- Orchestra
- Founded: mid-1960s
- Location: Sydney, New South Wales, Australia
- Concert hall: Opera House Orchestra pit of the Joan Sutherland Theatre
- Website: opera.org.au

The Opera Australia Orchestra (based in Sydney, New South Wales, Australia) is a full-time salaried orchestra, and a wholly owned subsidiary of Opera Australia. It is one of three salaried orchestras in Sydney, along with the Sydney Symphony Orchestra and the Australian Chamber Orchestra. The OAO performs almost exclusively in the Opera House Orchestra pit of the Joan Sutherland Theatre.

The OAO (and its Melbourne counterpart Orchestra Victoria) were known as The Elizabethan Sydney Orchestra and The Elizabethan Melbourne Orchestra respectively, established by the Australian Elizabethan Theatre Trust in 1967. These orchestras became the 'Australian Opera and Ballet Orchestra' in 1991, and State Orchestra of Victoria in 1986. The SOV has since been renamed Orchestra Victoria. In 2017, it was renamed the "Opera Australia Orchestra".

OAO's core strength is 53 players (compared with Sydney Symphony's 110) but is currently down to 42 (November 2020), due to Opera Australia making 16 positions redundant during the global pandemic. The company intends to replace a permanent workforce of secure jobs with a temporary workforce and insecure jobs. . Each player is selected by audition; if successful there is a trial process which may require 12 months to complete. More than 120 other musicians may join the OAO as casual musicians during a financial year; this is due in part to Occupational Health and Safety Act NSW 2000 requirements regarding noise levels associated with working in the Sydney Opera House orchestra pit.

== Repertory ==
The OAO provides orchestral accompaniment to Opera Australia and The Australian Ballet and is one of the few opera orchestras in the world that operates in a repertory style of operation over a period, or season, that can be some months in length. Other opera houses that operate this way are the Metropolitan Opera in New York City, The Royal Opera House Covent Garden in London and La Scala, Milan. 'Repertory style' also infers that over time, certain composers and operas become considered 'standard' to the working operation of the company. Composers Puccini, Verdi, Handel, Bizet and Wagner are standard parts of the repertory. OAO includes the ballet repertory pieces of Tchaikovsky, Minkus, and Prokofiev. Typically, opera consumes January–March and June–October. Ballet fills the rest of the year.

== Performances ==
In a typical year, the orchestra gives over 255 performances, plus rehearsals, featuring an average 12 operas. Its repertoire extends to Monteverdi, Alban Berg and Sondheim, and four ballet programs at 21 performances each. OAO also appears in gala concerts and special events such as Mazda Opera in The Domain and the New Year's Eve Gala Concert in the concert hall of the opera house.

In 1992 the orchestra was hired to record Antony Partos' music for Alison Maclean‘s drama film Crush, orchestrated by Derek Williams and conducted by Dobbs Franks. Crush was winner of Best Film Score at New Zealand Film and TV Awards, and three other film awards, including Best Sound Track.

In 2012 OAO appeared in Opera Australia's first event presentation of Handa Opera on Sydney Harbour in 18 performances of La traviata, using a purpose-built floating stage and orchestra pit, moored in Sydney's Farm Cove opposite the Sydney Opera House, sponsored in part by the International Foundation for Arts and Culture. Most years since there has been a new production: Carmen, Madama Butterfly, Aida, Turandot, with Carmen restaged in 2017.

OAO averages under 10% of Opera Australia's annual running costs.
