= Lac de la Case =

Lake in France

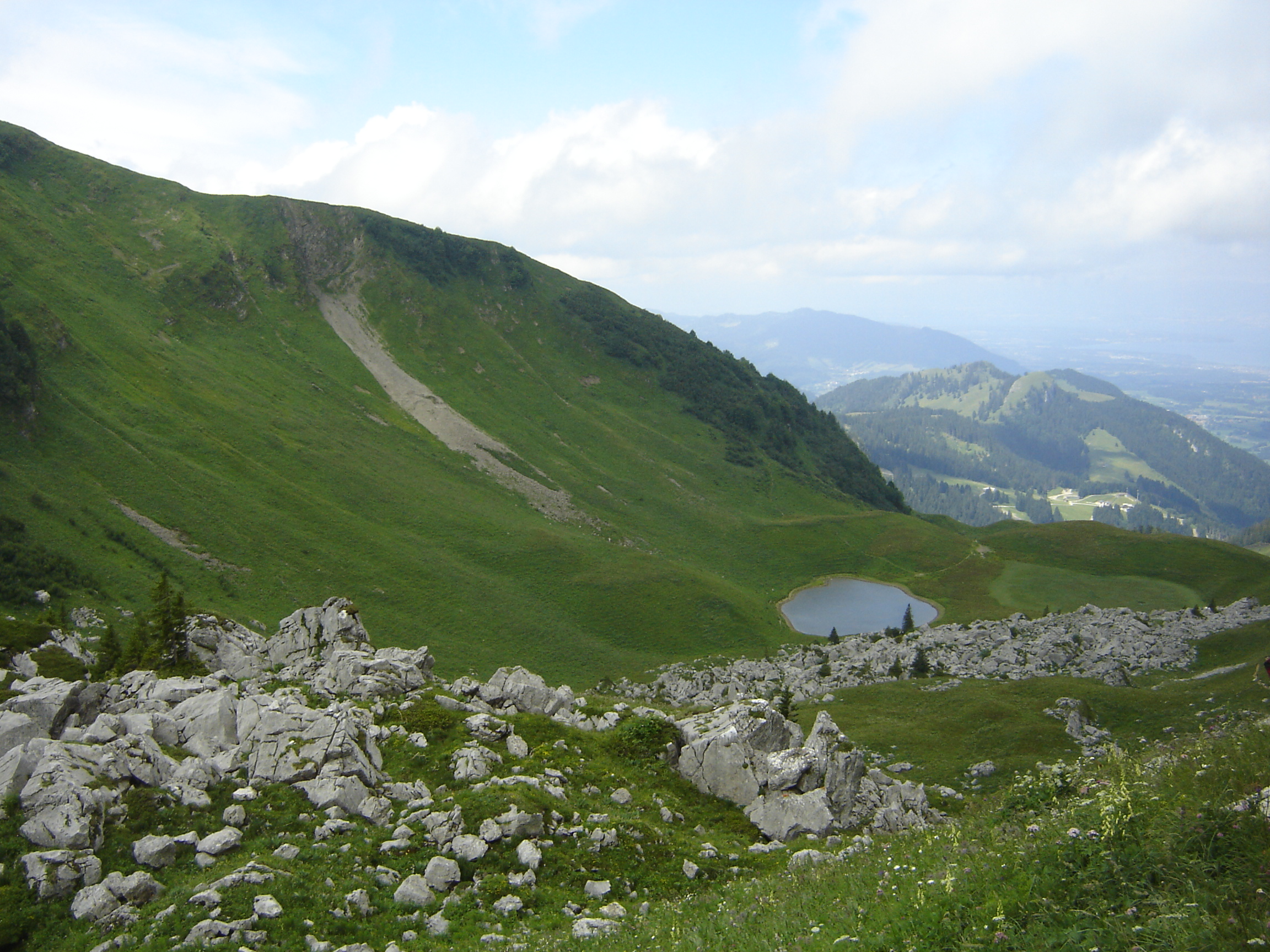

- Location within France
- Location: Bernex, Haute-Savoie
- Coordinates: 46.345278°N 6.733333°E
- Basin countries: France
- Surface elevation: 1,750 m (5,740 ft)

Lac de la Case is a lake at Bernex in Haute-Savoie, France.
