= China IPR SME Helpdesk =

The China IPR SME Helpdesk is a project funded by the European Commission's Directorate-General for Enterprise and Industry (DG ENTR). It provides European small and medium-sized enterprises with free, practical support on Intellectual Property Rights (IPR) in China. According to its website, The China IPR SME Helpdesk's mission is to "support European Union (EU) small and medium sized enterprises (SMEs) to both protect and enforce their Intellectual Property Rights (IPR) in or relating to China, through the provision of free information and services".

A pilot programme of The China IPR SME Helpdesk was established in 2008 under the Competitiveness and Innovation Framework Programme and it was announced in January 2011 that the Helpdesk project has been extended for an additional three years (through the end of 2013). In 2024, the European commission published updated guidance on intellectual property protection for European SMEs operations in China.
