= Bernex =

Bernex is:

- Bernex, a commune of the Canton of Geneva, Switzerland
- Bernex, a commune of the Haute-Savoie département, in France
