= Old State Capitol =

Old State Capitol may refer to:

- Old State Capitol (Milledgeville, Georgia), listed on the NRHP in Georgia
- Iowa Old Capitol Building in Iowa City, Iowa
- Old Capitol (Indiana) in Corydon, Indiana
- Old Louisiana State Capitol, Baton Rouge, LA, listed on the NRHP in Louisiana
- Old State Capitol State Historic Site in Springfield, Illinois, a U.S. National Historic Landmark
- Old State Capitol (Kentucky) in Frankfort, Kentucky, home to the Kentucky Historical Society
- Old Mississippi State Capitol, Jackson, Mississippi, a U.S. National Historic Landmark also known as Old State Capitol

== See also ==
- Old State House (disambiguation)
