= Culemborg fireworks disaster =

1991 fireworks accident in the Netherlands

- Date: 14 February 1991; 35 years ago
- Time: 10:50 GMT (11:50 local time)
- Location: Culemborg and Vianen, Netherlands
- Type: Fireworks disaster
- Cause: Undetermined, probably fire
- Deaths: 2
- Injuries: 20 or 30
- Property damage: 30 buildings damaged or destroyed, c. 4 million guilders (1992)

Culemborg fireworks factory (Netherlands)

The Culemborg fireworks disaster (Dutch: Vuurwerkramp in Culemborg, also known as the Klap van Culemborg "Bang of Culemborg") occurred on Thursday 14 February 1991 in Culemborg, the Netherlands, on the border with the municipality of Vianen. A storage space for fireworks of the MS Vuurwerk BV company ignited and exploded. There were two deaths, 20 or 30 non-fatal injuries and the explosions caused heavy structural damage in a large surrounding area.

Although the direct cause of the explosion was never determined, scientists from the Netherlands Organisation for Applied Scientific Research (TNO) did find contributing factors which led to such an unexpectedly powerful explosion and so much damage. However, the TNO's recommendations for stricter safety precautions for the production and storage of fireworks have not been carried out, due to fragmented responsibility for fireworks regulations placed in different governmental organisations, and a lack of urgency and resolve amongst the officials involved. The failure to amend policy led to the much larger Enschede fireworks disaster that happened nine years later (13 May 2000).

== Course of events ==
=== Location and construction ===
The MS Vuurwerk BV factory was located 50 metres east of the Diefdijk, a north–south dyke which forms the municipal and provincial border between the municipalities of Culemborg (province of Gelderland) in the east and Vianen (then province of South Holland, since 2002 province of Utrecht, since 2019 as part of Vijfheerenlanden) in the west.

The company was housed in two buildings: the first one containing a bunker dating from the Second World War (which remained intact during the disaster), an office, an assembly hall (25 by 16 square metres) and five small storage rooms. The second building, 20 metres to the east, was completed in 1990 and had only been in operation for a few months when the calamity occurred. It consisted of an assembling hall (20 by 12 square metres), four storage rooms (no. 6, 7, 8 and 9) and two workrooms (no. 3 and 4). The storage room walls were made of 0.2 m thick unreinforced concrete blocks, while the ceiling consisted of concrete hollow core slabs. The inner wall of the cavity walls were also concrete blocks while the outer wall was brickwork. The assembly hall was composed of steel trusses covered with asbestos plates.

=== Background ===
The owner, Henk Koolen, had been working in the fireworks business for 15 years, and achieved a good reputation within the Netherlands and abroad.

Nearby residents including Cornelis (Kees) Uittenboogaard had unsuccessfully protested against the fireworks factory's construction in the 1980s. A number of petitions were presented and Uittenboogaard even fought a legal battle against the factory up until the Council of State, but to no avail. It proved to be particularly difficult to prevent the factory's establishment because he and most other close residents of MS Vuurwerk lived on the South Holland side of the dyke, and thus could not influence the decision-making of the municipal and provincial authorities on the other side. In the run up to and the aftermath of the disaster, victims from Vianen complained that their interests had all too often been overlooked.

=== Explosions and fires ===
On 14 February 1991, around 11:50, a heavy explosion occurred in an outbuilding of MS Vuurwerk. Most likely, there were actually two explosions within 20 seconds of each other, the second one much stronger than the first. An enormous air pressure wave ensued, which caused major structural and bodily damage in a vast area around it. There was also a pitch-black cloud of dust which, according to Uittenboogaard, lasted for 5 to 7 minutes and obstructed all vision. The first thought of many residents was that war had broken out and a bombardment was taking place, or something like an airplane had crashed. For hours on end, fireworks continued to ignite, with new small explosions as a consequence, until late in the afternoon.

At the time of the catastrophe, seven employees were present in the factory. Of these, five were able to escape, including the owner Henk Koolen, co-worker Aat Boeschoten and a female secretary. The two remaining employees were initially reported as missing, later in the day it became clear they had been killed by the explosion.

In a radius of approximately 5 kilometres surrounding the fireworks factory, window panes shattered or trembled dangerously. The air pressure wave was so powerful that cars driving by on the A2 motorway 100 metres away were almost blown off the road.

=== Firefighting efforts ===
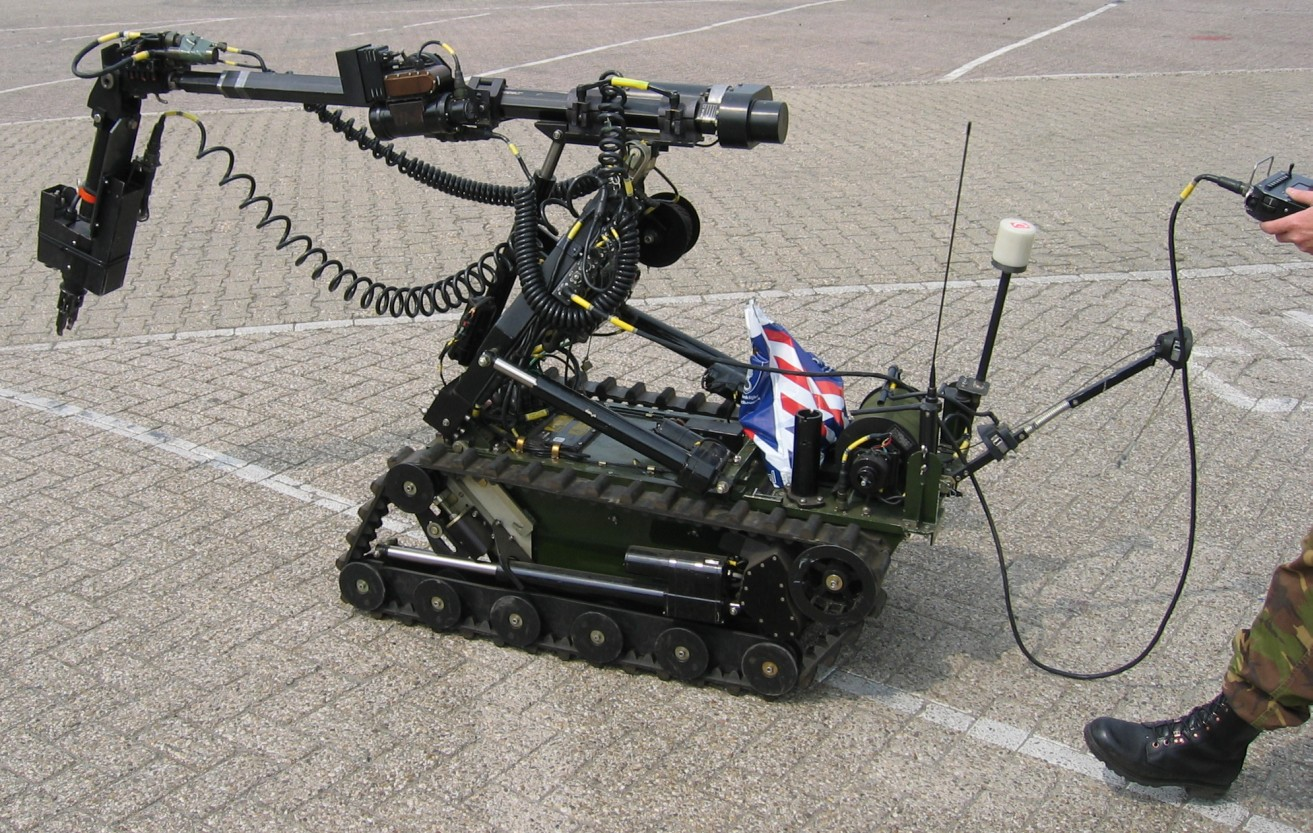
An EOD Wheelbarrow in 2006

The fire brigade arrived soon and closed down the perimeter. However, no one knew what kind of materials were stored inside the compound, or how high the risk of another huge explosion was. Especially in the still-intact bunker where many unexploded fireworks were stored. The Explosive Ordnance Disposal service (EOD), which, coincidentally, was headquartered in Culemborg until 2011, deployed a "Wheelbarrow" observation robot for reconnaissance. This robot tried to find a sign of the two missing persons while also attempting to determine whether it was safe enough for firefighters to approach the fire. The firefighters had to wait until either the "end of the afternoon" or the "beginning of the evening" until they were given permission to start extinguishing efforts, when the EOD deemed the danger of further explosions to be over.

== Aftermath ==
=== Victims and damage ===
There were two fatalities: factory owner Henk Koolen's daughter and her husband. Reportedly, 20 to 30 people sustained non-lethal injuries. Furthermore, a couple of dogs, kept as pets by nearby residents, were killed. The disaster also inflicted long-term psychological damage upon nearby residents.

Structural damage was estimated at 4 million Dutch guilders (1992). MS Vuurwerk was only insured for 1 million guilders. Some neighbours, such as livestock farmer Cornelis (Kees) Uittenboogaard and farmer J. Martens, were sufficiently insured, but most of the victims did not have enough insurance, or for religious reasons had decided not to insure themselves at all. One year later, legal struggles about who had to pay which damages were still ongoing.

=== Clearance and reconstruction ===
The army was deployed to aid in clearing the debris from the explosion. In the first three days of the operation, the soldiers had already gathered 22 tonnes of rubble in the surrounding fields. Not only was the area riddled with numerous pieces of brick, concrete, metal, wood and glass, but also asbestos.

Dozens of families were housed in temporary homes for years. Reconstruction was hindered by the fact that no party could be held responsible, and thus it was impossible to determine whether the victims should be paid indemnities from the insurance companies or the government. It was not until 29 March 1993 that nearby residents received word that they would be paid damages. The insurance companies of the factory repaid a million guilders to the injured parties and the factory itself paid another 300,000 from its own assets to cover all damage. Meanwhile, the municipalities of Culemborg and Vianen demanded another 700,000 guilders in compensation, primarily for the removal of asbestos pollution in the environment. Because it was found out that the damage sustained by the residents was estimated too high and did not amount to 1.3 million but rather 660,000 guilders, the municipalities, who were recognised as injured parties, eventually received 550,000 guilders of indemnities at the end of March 1993. Nevertheless, the nearby residents claimed even more compensation for the extra costs they had incurred for matters such as temporary housing.

=== Documentary ===
Journalist Hans Polak made a documentary in the months after the disaster, called Vuurwerk aan de Diefdijk ("Fireworks near the Diefdijk", 1991) for the VARA programme Impact. The film focuses on the clearance, reconstruction and emotional processing of nearby residents, as well as on the responsibilities of local government, including the handling of damage claims and allowing a possible rebuilding of the factory.

=== Factory reconstruction cancelled ===
To the great distress and annoyance of the overwhelming majority of nearby residents, Koolen has long maintained plans to rebuild his fireworks factory. Because it had never been determined that MS Vuurwerk had made mistakes, the municipality could not obstruct his plans when he intended to reconstruct his factory on the very same location. He also made a few preparations in doing so. In the end Koolen decided against it, sold his business to his colleague Aat Boeschoten, and died a few years later in 1996. As of 2016, the terrain of the exploded factory, unchanged but overgrown since the early 1990s, is still in the hands of a granddaughter and grandson of Koolen. There were no plans for the terrain, but they did not intend to build another fireworks factory.

== Investigation and consequences ==
=== Cause of the explosions ===
In April 1991, the TNO Prins Maurits Laboratorium published a report on the Culemborg fireworks disaster, commissioned by the Ministry of Defence. TNO concluded that relatively light fireworks in large quantities caused an unexpectedly heavy explosion, because they were no longer contained within their packages. Moreover, the fireworks had been misclassified as belonging to the risk class 1.1. In the end, the direct cause of the explosions has never been determined, but experts later mostly support the hypothesis that a spark caused by static electricity probably led to fire. As soon as there was a fire burning, a destructive chain reaction ensued.

TNO concluded that there probably had been two major explosions, the first occurring in storage room 6, quickly followed by the second in storage rooms 7, 8, and 9. This is derived from the facts that two craters were found, with concrete plates from the crater under rooms 7, 8 and 9 shoved over those under room 6, and the crack patterns in the concrete floors in front of the four rooms. Another fact is that most, but not all, witnesses testified having heard two explosions within 20 seconds of each other, the second being much more powerful.

In April 1993, the direct cause of the explosion had still not been discovered, making it unclear whose responsibility it was. Eventually, after much struggle, all parties involved agreed to a compromise regarding repayments.

=== Quantity of powder ===
Nearby residents had always been told only 50 kilograms of powder were stored in the factory, but because of the powerful blast, initial assumptions hypothesised many more. Exactly how many and which kind of explosive substances and products were kept inside at the time of the disaster has never been clarified. As of 2001, the consensus amongst experts, including the Openbaar Ministerie in Utrecht, research institute TNO, and inspectors and colleagues in the fireworks business, was that there had "presumably" not been more than the permitted 200 kilograms of gunpowder present in February 1991. Once every two to three weeks, an inspector visited MS Vuurwerk, who, according to then-commander H. Kapel of the Corps Inspectors Dangerous Substances (an inspection service within the Ministry of Transport), would have noticed it if the maximal quantity had been exceeded.

Therefore, TNO's conclusion was that fireworks obtained significantly more explosive power when assembled and modified. Because the fireworks had also been misclassified, the factory contained much heavier fireworks than the company's licence allowed for.

=== TNO recommendations; reflection after 2000 Enschede fireworks disaster ===
The April 1991 TNO report made several recommendations to the four government ministries involved in order to improve fireworks safety. These comprised, amongst other things:

- Fireworks should be stored much further away from built-up areas than was common at the time.
- Testing of major fireworks, regarding their classification, should happen seven times: "from fabrication via transportation, modification, assemblage, storage, once again transportation and usage."
- Discouraging applying the same risk class to the transportation phase as to the succeeding phases, "especially when the firework is no longer stored in the packaging and modifications to the fireworks have been done." As soon as the fireworks are taken out of the packages and modified, they must be reclassified.

On 13 May 2000, a similar but much larger fireworks disaster happened in Enschede at the S.E. Fireworks factory, leading to 23 deaths, about 950 injuries, and the complete devastation of the entire residential area of Roombeek. In response, it was almost unanimously concluded that these could have been prevented or better controlled if the lessons from the Culemborg fireworks disaster had been converted into more rigorous safety measures. Everyone wondered why this had not occurred. Investigations showed that little to nothing was done with TNO's recommendations, because the ministries and inspection services "had communicated badly with each other, or not at all", Interior Minister Klaas de Vries admitted in 2001.

The 15 January 2001 investigative report of the Firefighting Care and Disaster Control Inspection of the Ministry of the Interior, titled Onderzoek vuurwerkramp Enschede. Follow up Culemborg ("Enschede fireworks disaster investigation. Follow up Culemborg"), attempted to answer the question ‘To what extent have the conclusions and recommendations, proceeding from investigation into the 1991 fireworks explosion in Culemborg, resulted in actions?’. The report revealed that the TNO report was first presented to the Ministry of Defence, which serves an advisory role when granting licences to fireworks companies. But the Defence service for Environmental Licences did not consider urging stricter rules to be part of its job. In a 1991 letter, Arnhem-based advocate general Korvinus warned his superiors at the Ministry of Justice about other fireworks storage facilities throughout the Netherlands, but this ministry did not regard fireworks storage as its task. The Dangerous Substance Accident Control service from the Interior Ministry did seek to introduce stricter regulations for fireworks, which was discussed in several meetings of the Commissie Preventie Rampen door gevaarlijke stoffen (CPR, Dangerous Substances-borne Disasters Prevention Commission), but that was part of the Firefighting department, which at the time was supposed to focus on extinguishing fires, not on controlling risks. Rules surrounding the storage of fireworks were seen as the responsibility of the Ministry of Housing, Spatial Planning and the Environment (VROM).

During ten CPR meetings conducted from 12 September 1991 until 31 March 1994, the subject of fireworks was deferred every time, and eventually eliminated. A February 2001 evaluation report revealed that the CPR was barely interested in fireworks. After investigation by TNO, the topic was put back on the CPR agenda in 1995; a working group was established to revise the fireworks directive, but the ministries involved did not provide funding and personnel for it. In 1999, the CPR decided to repeal the current fireworks directive. While waiting for a new directive, the Ministry of Defence's office, which advised municipalities on issuing licences to fireworks companies, acted on its own accord. However, the office appeared to barely function properly. Because of this bureaucratic maze with fragmented responsibilities, almost nothing was done with the TNO recommendations, and no extra safety measures were taken until after the 2000 Enschede fireworks disaster.

Since the explosion of the Culemborg fireworks factory in 1991, almost all 26 Dutch fireworks companies operated outside of populated areas; as of 2000, a few were located on the outskirts of urban areas. At the time, the choice of location for fireworks companies was a municipal responsibility. S.E. Fireworks was the last company still operating in the middle of a residential area. The municipality of Enschede commanded a relocation, scheduled for 2002, due to a desire to build more houses on the current factory grounds; safety was of secondary concern.

== See also ==
- List of fireworks accidents and incidents
- Fireworks policy in the Netherlands
- Enschede fireworks disaster
