= European Agency for Safety and Health at Work =

Agency of the European Union

EU-OSHA

Agency overview
- Formed: 1994
- Jurisdiction: European Union
- Headquarters: Bilbao, Spain
- Motto: Making Europe a safer, healthier and more productive place to work.
- Agency executive: William Cockburn Salazar, Executive Director
- Key document: Regulation (EU) 2019/126
- Website: osha.europa.eu

Map
- European Agency for Safety and Health at Work (European Union)

The European Agency for Safety and Health at Work (EU-OSHA) is a decentralised agency of the European Union with the task of collecting, analysing and disseminating relevant information that can serve the needs of businesses, governments and specialists involved in safety and health at work. Set up in 1994 by Council Regulation (EC) No 2062/94 (replaced by Regulation (EU) 2019/126 on 20 February 2019), EU-OSHA is based in Bilbao, Spain, and employs specialists in occupational safety and health (OSH), communication and administration. William Cockburn Salazar is the current Executive Director of EU-OSHA.

EU-OSHA contributes to an evidence and knowledge base on current, new and emerging risk to support policymaking and research. It also facilitates the development and exchanges of tools and resources to improve prevention in the workplace, and drives awareness-raising (particularly the Healthy Workplaces Campaigns) and networking actions to foster a positive risk prevention culture at work. The Agency works through diverse networks spanning the EU, being the network of national Focal Points one of its main assets.

EU-OSHA plays an important role in the implementation of the 2021-27 EU Strategic Framework on Health and Safety at Work. This framework policy shapes the Agency’s main priorities and multiannual strategies.

EU-OSHA publishes a monthly multilingual newsletter, OSHmail, which provides updates on the latest developments in OSH and offers access to a variety of resources, including reports and other types of publications.

== Networks ==
EU-OSHA works in partnership with a wide range of organisations. The Directorate-General Employment, Social Affairs & Inclusion is its reference at the European Commission. At the national level, EU-OSHA is represented by a network of focal points in over 30 countries across Europe. Focal points are usually the primary safety and health organisation of a particular country. Each focal point operates a tripartite national network to ensure that information on safety and health at work can be effectively collected and disseminated.

EU-OSHA emphasises the importance of a tripartite approach, whereby it works in partnership with governments, employers and workers' representatives. This tripartite structure (Management Board) is key to the way EU-OSHA implements its work programme and carries out its campaigns. Through its campaigns EU-OSHA also works with companies and associations in the public and private sector, and with the Enterprise Europe Network (EEN), a business support network that aims to help small businesses in the European marketplace.

== Main activities ==
=== Analysis and research ===
EU-OSHA is responsible for contributing to the evidence base through commissioning, collecting and publishing studies on OSH as well as monitoring, collecting and analysing statistical information on workplace risks across the EU.

EU-OSHA’s website contains a OSH-themed section, including topics like ageing, COVID-19, dangerous substances, digitalisation, disability, health and social care, mental health, work-related diseases and more.

The online encyclopaedia (OSHwiki) provides up-to-date information on various OSH topics with a European perspective. The website features technical articles by EU-OSHA and independent authors.

One of EU-OSHA’s key objectives is to provide data on new and emerging OSH risks to aid policy-makers and researchers in taking effective action. To achieve this, the Agency runs foresight projects that anticipate future safety and health concerns. These projects explore potential scenarios arising from technological and societal changes, highlight implications for occupational safety and health, and suggest ways to avoid future risks.

=== Facts & figures ===
EU-OSHA carries out a series of EU-wide surveys to get an insight into occupational safety and health issues across European companies, their management at the workplace, as well as the identification of emerging risks and OSH trends in order to help policy-makers and researchers.

The European Survey of Enterprises on New and Emerging Risks (ESENER) looks at how European workplaces manage OSH risks in practice. With the involvement of thousands of businesses and organisations across Europe, this survey focuses on psychosocial risks, drivers and barriers to OSH management and worker participation.

The Workers’ Exposure Survey on cancer risk factors in Europe (WES) aims to better identify the cancer risk factors responsible for most of the exposures, providing an accurate and comprehensive overview, and contributing to preventive measures, awareness-raising and policy-making, as well as helping in the fight against occupational cancer.

The OSH Pulse survey offers valuable insights into the impact of COVID-19, digitalisation and climate change on workers’ health and wellbeing and related workplace measures.

=== Prevention ===
EU-OSHA aims to create a culture of risk prevention and is involved with designing practical instruments that can be used by companies of micro, small and medium sizes that will help them to assess workplace risks and implement a preventive action plan. As part of this aim EU-OSHA has created the OiRA (Online interactive Risk Assessment) web platform that enables the creation of sectoral risk assessment tools in a number of languages in an easy and standardised way.

EU-OSHA also shares knowledge and good practice on safety and health through its Good Practice Awards scheme and its publications, ranging from in-depth research reports to topical info sheets, designed for use in the workplace.

=== Campaigning and awareness-raising ===
EU-OSHA raises awareness about occupational safety and health through its Healthy Workplaces Campaigns, run with partners in over 30 European countries since 2000. Each 25-month campaign focuses on a specific theme, such as digitalisation (2023-25) or psychosocial risks and mental health at work (2026-28). As part of these campaigns, EU-OSHA produces freely available information, practical guides, tools, and communication materials, translated into over 20 European languages. These campaigns are conducted in partnership with more than 100 campaign and media partners, as well as through the agency's network of national focal points and the Enterprise Europe Network.

Linked to and acting as an annual focus for campaigns, EU-OSHA is coordinating the European Week for Safety and Health at Work, held each year in October, when events such as training sessions, conferences and workshops are held. Such events are organised across Europe by the focal points in Member States.

EU-OSHA, together with national safety and health organisations, has produced animated films highlighting workplace health and safety. The main character, Napo, represents a typical employee who encounters various hazards but also suggests improvements. In his first film, "Napo in... The Best Signs Story", he intentionally doesn't follow the signs to learn a lesson.

== See also ==
- Agencies of the European Union
- European Foundation for the Improvement of Living and Working Conditions
- National Institute for Safety and Health at Work (Spain, EU-OSHA member)
