= List of medical abbreviations: O =

Sortable table
Abbreviation	Meaning
o̅	Nothing [ō—letter o with overbar]
O_{2}	oxygen
OA	osteoarthritis
OAB	Overactive bladder
OAF	osteoclast activating factor
OB	Occult blood
OB; OB-GYN ob-gyne	obstetrics and gynecology
Obl	oblique
OBOT	Office-based Opioid Treatment
OBS	organic brain syndrome
Occ	occasional
OCD	obsessive-compulsive disorder
OCG	oral cholecystogram
OCNA	Orthopedic Clinics of North America
OCP	oral contraceptive pill
OCT	optical coherence tomography
OD	once daily (from Latin omne in die)
OD	right eye (from Latin oculus dexter)
OD	overdose
OD	occupational disease
ODC	ornithine decarboxylase
OE	otitis externa
O/E	on examination
OFC	orbitofrontal cortex
OGTT	oral glucose tolerance test
OHL	oral hairy leukoplakia
OHS	Obesity hypoventilation syndrome
OHT	Orthotopic heart transplantation
Oint	ointment
OM	osteomyelitis
OM	otitis media
om	every morning (from Latin omni mane). Generally written in lowercase.
OME	otitis media with effusion (fluid in the inner ear without other symptoms)
OMS	Opsoclonus-myoclonus syndrome
on	every night (from Latin omni nocte). Generally written in lowercase.
O/N	overnight
OOB	out of bed
OP	outpatient department
OP	Osteoporosis
O&P	ova and parasites
OPAT	Outpatient parenteral antibiotic therapy
OPD	outpatient department
OPPT	oriented to person, place, and time
OPV	outpatient visit
OR	operating room (aka operating theatre)
OR	odds ratio
ORIF	open reduction internal fixation
ORSA	oxacillin-resistant staphylococcus aureus
ORT	oral rehydration therapy
OS	left eye (from Latin oculus sinister)
OS	orthopedic surgery
OS	overall survival
OSA	obstructive sleep apnea
OSH	outside hospital
Osm	osmolarity
Osteo	osteomyelitis
OT	occupational therapy
OTC	over-the-counter drug
OTD	out the door (discharged)
OTPP	oriented to time, place, and person
OTTR	Organ Transplant Tracking Record
OU	both eyes (from Latin oculi uterque)
OV	office visit (see ambulatory care)
oz	ounce
