= Bernex, Haute-Savoie =

Bernex Barné (Arpitan)
- Commune
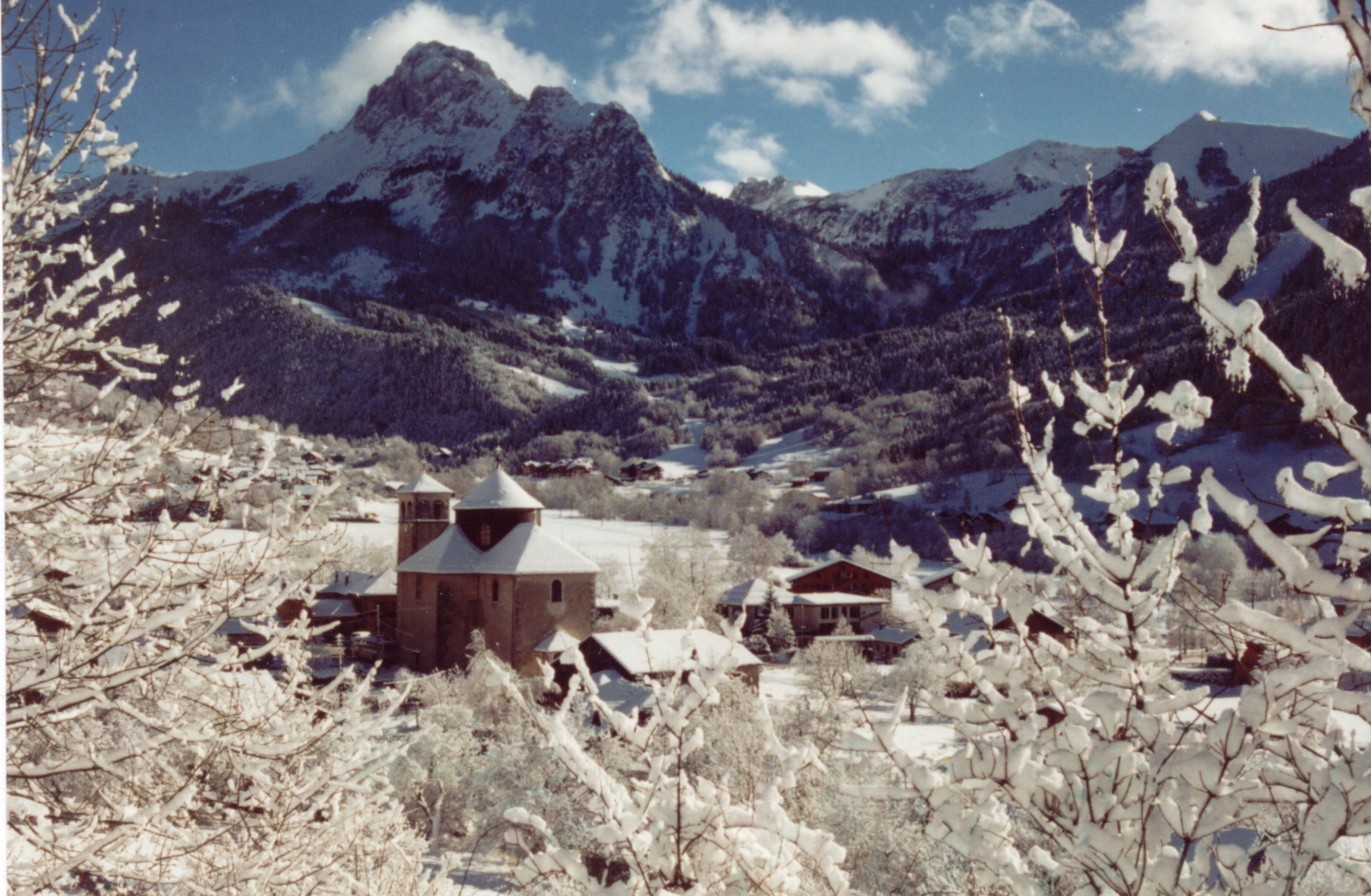
- The church in Bernex

- Coat of arms
- Location of Bernex
- Location within France Location within Auvergne-Rhône-Alpes
- Coordinates: 46°21′39″N 6°40′33″E
- Country: France
- Region: Auvergne-Rhône-Alpes
- Department: Haute-Savoie
- Arrondissement: Thonon-les-Bains
- Canton: Évian-les-Bains
- Intercommunality: Pays d'Évian Vallée d'Abondance

Government
  - Mayor (2020–2026): Pierre-André Jacquier
- Area^{1}: 22.31 km^{2} (8.61 sq mi)
- Highest elevation: 2,222 m (7,290 ft)
- Lowest elevation: 820 m (2,690 ft)
- Population (2023): 1,472
  - Density: 65.98/km^{2} (170.9/sq mi)
- Demonym: Bernoland / Bernolande
- Time zone: UTC+01:00 (CET)
  - Summer (DST): UTC+02:00 (CEST)
- INSEE/Postal code: 74033 /74500
- ^{1} French Land Register data, which excludes lakes, ponds, glaciers > 1 km^{2} (0.386 sq mi or 247 acres) and river estuaries.

Bernex (French pronunciation: [bɛʁnɛks]; Arpitan: Barné) is a commune in the Haute-Savoie department in the Auvergne-Rhône-Alpes region in south-eastern France. Its highest point is the Dent d'Oche (2222 meters).

== Climate ==
Bernex is located at an elevation of 955 metres (3,133 ft), within a natural cirque bordered by Mont César to the north, the Dent d'Oche to the east, Mont Baron to the south, and the Gavot Plateau to the west.

A warm-summer humid continental climate dominates within the upper montane zone (Köppen climate classification: Dfb), owing both to its inland location and its elevation, which greatly limits the moderating influence of nearby Lake Geneva. Although the lake is only a few miles away, the village is separated from it by the Col de Creusaz, which rises to more than 1,270 metres (4,170 ft).

As a result, winters are cold and snowy, with an average January temperature of −3.4 °C (25.9 °F), including average daytime highs of 0.0 °C (32.0 °F) and average nighttime lows of −6.8 °C (19.8 °F), while summers are mild and often marked by thunderstorms, with an average July temperature of 18.5 °C (65.3 °F), including average daytime highs of 25.2 °C (77.4 °F) and average nighttime lows of 11.8 °C (53.2 °F). Rainfall is abundant throughout the year and the growing season lasts about 6 months.

Climate data for Bernex, Haute-Savoie, France (modelled 1991-2021 normals at an altitude of 955 metres (3,133 ft))
Month	Jan	Feb	Mar	Apr	May	Jun	Jul	Aug	Sep	Oct	Nov	Dec	Year
Mean daily maximum °C (°F)	0.0 (32.0)	1.8 (35.2)	6.2 (43.2)	11.1 (52.0)	16.0 (60.8)	20.8 (69.4)	25.2 (77.4)	24.4 (75.9)	19.6 (67.3)	13.8 (56.8)	6.6 (43.9)	1.3 (34.3)	12.2 (54.0)
Daily mean °C (°F)	−3.4 (25.9)	−2.8 (27.0)	1.7 (35.1)	5.8 (42.4)	10.7 (51.3)	14.7 (58.5)	18.5 (65.3)	17.9 (64.2)	13.9 (57.0)	9.3 (48.7)	3.2 (37.8)	−1.7 (28.9)	7.3 (45.1)
Mean daily minimum °C (°F)	−6.8 (19.8)	−6.2 (20.8)	−2.8 (27.0)	0.5 (32.9)	5.0 (41.0)	8.6 (47.5)	11.8 (53.2)	11.4 (52.5)	8.3 (46.9)	4.8 (40.6)	−0.2 (31.6)	−4.7 (23.5)	2.5 (36.5)
Average precipitation mm (inches)	135 (5.3)	120 (4.7)	125 (4.9)	105 (4.1)	115 (4.5)	115 (4.5)	105 (4.1)	110 (4.3)	115 (4.5)	130 (5.1)	135 (5.3)	140 (5.5)	1,450 (57.1)
Average rainy days	13	12	13	12	13	12	11	11	10	12	13	14	146
Source: climate-data.org

== Demography ==
Historical population

Year	Pop.	±% p.a.
1793	731	—
1861	955	+0.39%
1911	959	+0.01%
1962	711	−0.58%
1968	613	−2.44%
1975	618	+0.12%
1982	638	+0.46%

Year	Pop.	±% p.a.
1990	737	+1.82%
1999	854	+1.65%
2007	1,178	+4.10%
2012	1,248	+1.16%
2017	1,352	+1.61%
2023	1,472	+1.43%

Source: EHESS and INSEE

== See also ==
- Communes of the Haute-Savoie department
