= Roombeek =

Suburb of Enschede, Netherlands

Coordinates: 52.2297°N 6.89611°E

- Suburb
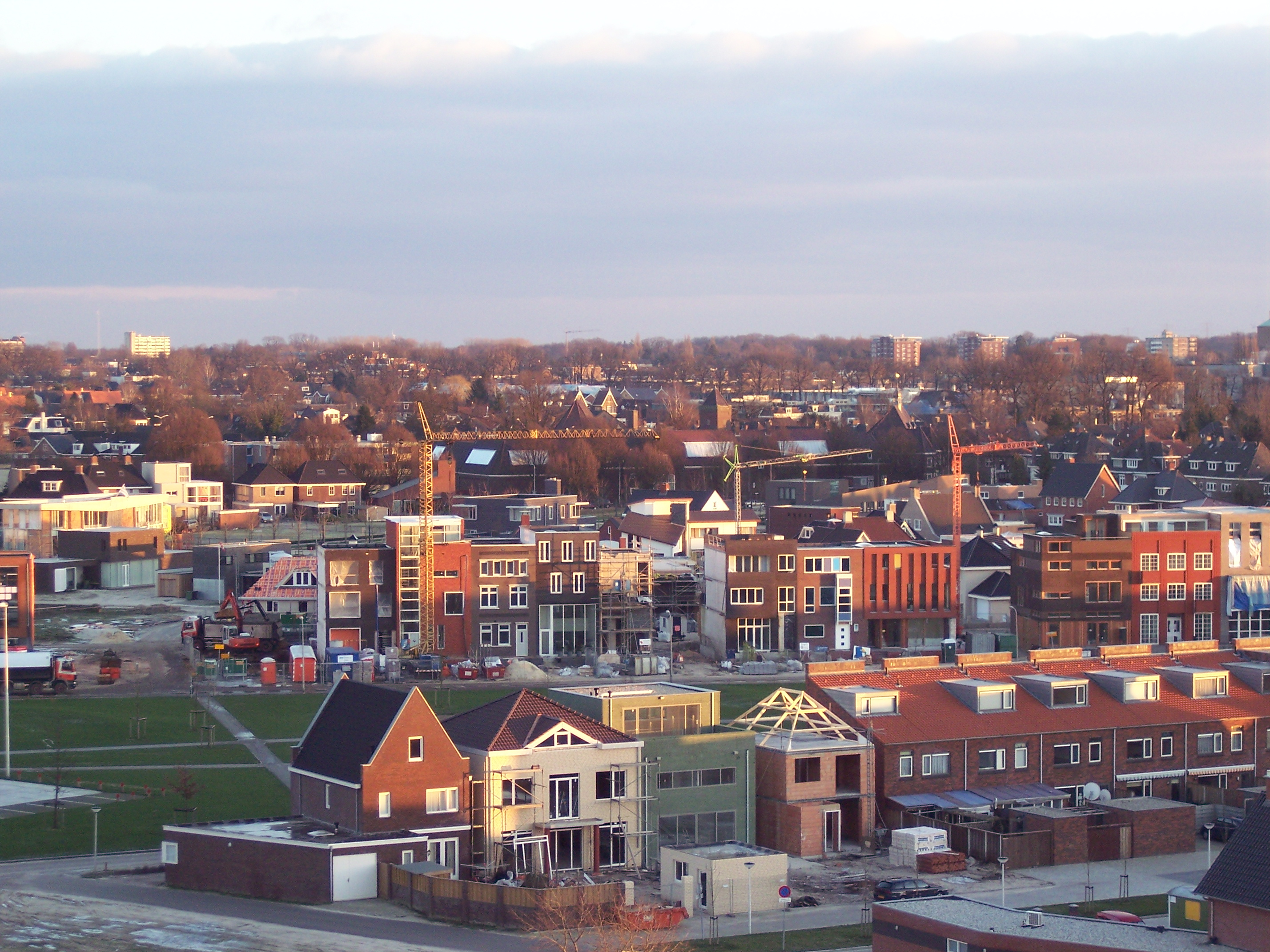
- Aerial view of Roombeek showing new construction

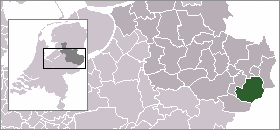

- Roombeek in the municipality of Enschede.
- Country: Netherlands
- Province: Overijssel
- Municipality: Enschede
- Time zone: UTC+1 (CET)
  - Summer (DST): UTC+2 (CEST)

Roombeek (Dutch pronunciation: [ˈroːmbeːk]) is a working-class suburb of the Dutch city of Enschede. It made international headlines due to the Enschede fireworks warehouse disaster (Dutch, "Vuurwerkramp") on 13 May 2000. The warehouse explosion in Roombeek caused 23 deaths, and wounded 947 people. Around 400 homes were destroyed, and 1,500 were seriously damaged by the fireworks explosion.

Plans already existed for a major renovation of the district. Many old factory complexes are now renovated and suitable for residence, work, and cultural activities. A location along the Roombeek waterway was dedicated as a memorial to the four firefighters who died in the fireworks disaster.

== Reconstruction ==
After the fireworks disaster, confidence in the town needed to be restored. Thus, a supervised reconstruction of the area was carried out, called Project Reconstruction Roombeek. Urban supervisor Pi de Bruijn was chosen to lead the project, due to his background in Twente, and extensive experience with other major urban projects. De Bruijn decided that the district largely be planned according to the ideas of Roombeek's citizenry.

== Participation ==
The project was started with the involvement of many inhabitants of Roombeek. Reconstruction project staff talked with area families (at times accompanied by an interpreter), so that residents could speak their demands, and their wishes could be put on paper.

This resulted in the following objectives:

- A district to return to
- A lively neighborhood
- A familiar area
- A safe neighborhood
- A district with history
- A district with a future value
- An area without borders
- The district into their own hands

=== The Three Axes of Roombeek ===
The new plan of Roombeek (after the 2000 disaster), is based on the original map (a familiar area). The emphasis is on three axes: the Roomweg from east to west, the Lonneker Spoorlaan from south to north, and the Museum Avenue. Along the Museum Avenue axis is a strict height restriction, which means that all new buildings must be reviewed by De Bruijn himself.

The three axial roads lead to the traditional town centre of Roombeek, where the Ekenhof and Prismare are located. The node is also the square to The Roozendaal and Twentse Welle.

=== Public space in Roombeek ===
The area is known for a lively public character. There are now large tracts of public space, including:

- The Lasonderbleek, with the theme "remember". That theme was chosen because of this area's proximity to the site where the fireworks disaster occurred.
- The Stroinksbleek, with the theme "culture". This area includes a lake, and a "culture cluster"- where concerts and other art performances can be performed.
- The Lonnekerbleek, with the theme of "relaxation". This park is still under construction.

== Architecture in Roombeek ==
Roombeek has an area with innovative and unique architecture. Buildings and designs from the following architects can be found in Roombeek:

- Claus and Kaan, Amsterdam
- Erick van Egeraat

== Transport ==
Roombeek is within walking distance of the Enschede Station. In addition, the district also accessible by bus from:

- Line 2 Deppenbroek
- Line 60 Oldenzaal The Thije
- Line 61 Overdinkel
- Line 62 Denekamp
