= Competitiveness and Innovation Framework Programme =

EU economic development programme

The Competitiveness and Innovation Framework Programme (CIP) of the European Commission, which operated from 2007 to 2013, aimed to improve the competitiveness of European companies facing the challenges of globalization. The programme was mainly aimed at small and medium-sized enterprises (SMEs), which could receive support for innovation activities, better access to finance and business support services. The programme sought to encourage the usage of information and communications technologies (ICT), renewable energies and to promote energy efficiency.

== History ==
The CIP was based on Decision No 1639/2006/EC of the European Parliament and of the Council of 24 October 2006 establishing a Competitiveness and Innovation Framework Programme (2007 to 2013).

The CIP is complementary to the 7th Framework Programme (FP7); the two programmes were to be "mutually-reinforcing" and "each designed to contribute to the success of the other". The Commission noted during the recession which occurred from 2007 onwards that small businesses needed additional support and so the implementation of the programme's financial instruments was speeded up and its approval procedures were simplified.

A further programme, COSME, followed up CIP and ran 2014 to 2020.

== Operational programmes ==
The CIP consisted of three programmes:

- Entrepreneurship and Innovation Programme (EIP)
- Information Communication Technologies Policy support Programme (ICT PSP)
- Intelligent Energy Europe (IEE).

All three programmes were managed by the Executive Agency for Competitiveness and Innovation (EACI), an EU government body established by the European Commission to operate and oversee the various activities of CIP.

=== Entrepreneurship and Innovation Programme (EIP) ===
The EIP aimed to facilitate access to finance for the start-up and growth of SMEs and to encourage investment in innovation activities and to create an environment favourable to SME cooperation, particularly in the field of cross-border cooperation, thereby promoting and assisting in all forms of innovation in enterprises. It specifically supported innovation efforts in the ecological sector. It also had a broader ambition to promote an entrepreneurship and innovation culture and related economic and administrative reform.

To help achieve these objectives the Commission has funded a number of actions. One of these was the formation of the Enterprise Europe Network, which started to form during January 2008. This network has been established by integrating two former networks: the Euro Info Centres (EIC) and the Innovation Relay Centres (IRC). There were over 500 regional teams across Europe and beyond in 40 countries, making it the world's largest business and innovation support network. The objective of integrating the two networks is to offer businesses a one-stop-shop of integrated services under one roof to better assist companies in addressing their business and innovation need. The type of services offered by many of the regional teams comprises:

- business partnering such as supplier, distribution and joint venture partner searches
- Online tools for tracking European public sector tenders
- Online facilities for assistance in finance and grant searches
- Advise on IPR and legal matters
- Advice on finance including grants, debt and risk
- Assist businesses in accessing research programmes and apply for R&D grants
- Advice and assistance on accessing EU programmes and funds
- Access to information on EU policies, regulations and support programmes
- Technology and R&D partnering
- Assistance for accessing Seventh Framework Programme (FP7)

Each of the Enterprise Europe Network Centres also offer a channel for passing feedback from businesses to the Commission on policies. All the Centres are also required to help engage businesses in EU policy-making by promoting consultations opened by the EC. The Network is essentially the front line for business and innovation support offered by Directorate General Enterprise and Industry, one of the various divisions or Directorate Generals comprising the European Commission.

In addition to the new Network, DG Enterprise & Industry have established other initiatives such as the European Investment Fund (EIF), which provisions for venture capital aimed at SMEs - in particular high-tech early-stage companies.

== See also ==
- Lisbon Strategy
- ManagEnergy
- Seventh Framework Programme
