= Otia (given name) =

Otia (Georgian: ოტია) is a masculine Georgian given name. Notable people with this name include:

- Otia Dadiani (fl. 1728 – died 1757), a Georgian ruling prince
- Otia Ioseliani (1930 – 2011), a Georgian novelist and dramatist
