= OSHmail =

OSHMail is an electronic newsletter from the European Agency for Safety and Health at Work (EU-OSHA).

It is a monthly summary of the latest news, events, and occupational safety and health information published at the EU-OSHA website. Most of the content is available in 25 languages. Currently more than 68,000 subscribers receive OSHmail each month; subscription is free.
