= Old State House =

Old State House or Old Statehouse may refer to:

- Old Colony House, Newport, Rhode Island, also known as Old State House
- Old State Capitol (Kentucky), also called Old Statehouse
- Old State House (Boston), Massachusetts
- Old State House (Connecticut)
- Old State House (Little Rock, Arkansas)
- Old State House (Providence, Rhode Island)
- Old Statehouse (Dover, Delaware), listed on the National Register of Historic Places in Kent County, Delaware
- One of 5 former capitol buildings of Illinois, including:
  - Old State Capitol State Historic Site (Illinois), Springfield – fifth Illinois state capitol
  - Vandalia State House State Historic Site – fourth Illinois state capitol

== See also ==
- Old State Capitol (disambiguation)
