= Occupational Safety and Health Act (United States) =

United States labor law

- Other short titles: OSH Act
- Long title: An Act to assure safe and healthful working conditions for working men and women; by authorizing enforcement of the standards developed under the Act; by assisting and encouraging the States in their efforts to assure safe and healthful working conditions; by providing for research, information, education, and training in the field of occupational safety and health; and for other purposes.
- Nicknames: Occupational Safety and Health Act of 1970
- Enacted by: the 91st United States Congress
- Effective: April 28, 1971

Citations
- Public law: 91-596
- Statutes at Large: 84 Stat. 1590

Codification
- Titles amended: 29 U.S.C.: Labor
- U.S.C. sections created: 29 U.S.C. ch. 15 § 651 et seq.

Legislative history
- Introduced in the Senate as S. 2193; Passed the Senate on November 17, 1970 (83-3); Reported by the joint conference committee on December 17, 1970; agreed to by the House on December 17, 1970 (310-58); Signed into law by President Richard Nixon on December 29, 1970

Major amendments
- Safety Appliance Act

United States Supreme Court cases
- Gade v. National Solid Wastes Management Ass'n, 505 U.S. 88 (1992); National Federation of Independent Business v. Department of Labor, Occupational Safety and Health Administration, No. 21A244, 595 U.S. ___ (2022)

The Occupational Safety and Health Act of 1970 is a US labor law governing the federal law of occupational health and safety in the private sector and federal government in the United States. It was enacted by Congress in 1970 and was signed by President Richard Nixon on December 29, 1970. Its main goal is to ensure that employers provide employees with an environment free from recognized hazards, such as exposure to toxic chemicals, excessive noise levels, mechanical dangers, heat or cold stress, or unsanitary conditions. The Act created the Occupational Safety and Health Administration (OSHA) and the National Institute for Occupational Safety and Health (NIOSH).

The Act can be found in the United States Code at title 29, chapter 15.

== History of federal workplace safety legislation ==
Few workplace health and safety protections were available through the federal government before the passage of OSHA. The American system of mass production encouraged the use of machinery, while the statutory regime did nothing to protect workplace safety. For most employers, it was cheaper to replace a dead or injured worker than it was to introduce safety measures. Tort law provided little recourse for relief for the survivors of dead workers or for injured employees. After the Civil War, some improvements were made through the establishment of state railroad and factory commissions, the adoption of new technology (such as the railway air brake), and more widespread availability of life insurance. But the overall impact of these improvements was minimal.

The first federal safety legislation was enacted in the Progressive period. In 1893, Congress passed the Safety Appliance Act, the first federal statute to require safety equipment in the workplace (the law applied only to railroad equipment, however). In 1910, in response to a series of highly publicized and deadly mine explosions and collapses, Congress established the United States Bureau of Mines to conduct research into mine safety (although the Bureau had no authority to regulate mine safety). Backed by trade unions, many states also enacted workers' compensation laws which discouraged employers from permitting unsafe workplaces. These laws, as well as the growing power of labor unions and public anger toward poor workplace safety, led to significant reductions in worker accidents for a time.

Industrial production increased significantly in the United States during World War II, and industrial accidents soared. Winning the war took precedence over safety, and most labor unions were more concerned with maintaining wages in the face of severe inflation than with workplace health and safety. After the war ended, however, workplace accident rates remained high and began to rise. In the two years preceding OSHA's enactment, 14,000 workers died each year from workplace hazards, and another 2 million were disabled or harmed. Additionally, the "chemical revolution" introduced a vast array of new chemical compounds to the manufacturing environment. The health effects of these chemicals were poorly understood, and workers received few protections against prolonged or high levels of exposure. While a few states, such as California and New York, had enacted workplace safety as well as workplace health legislation, most states had not changed their workplace protection laws since the turn of the century.

== Passage ==
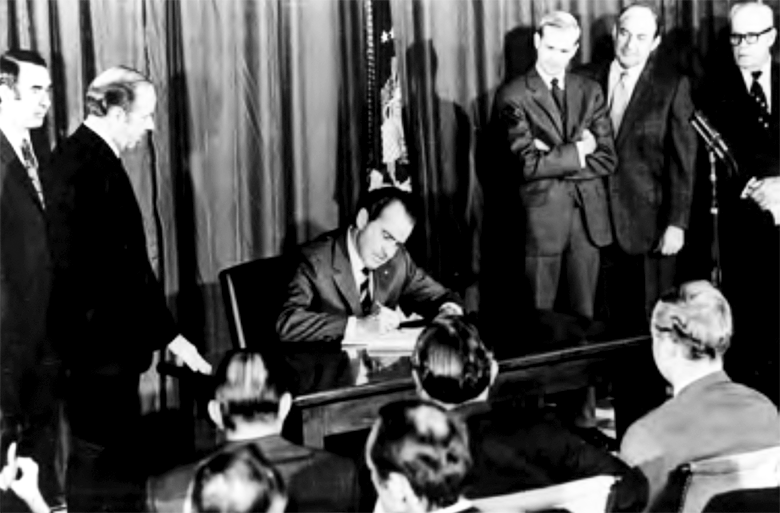
Richard Nixon signing the Occupational Safety and Health Act on December 29, 1970.

In the mid-1960s, growing awareness of the environmental impact of many chemicals had led to a politically powerful environmental movement. Some labor leaders seized on the public's growing unease over chemicals in the environment, arguing that the effect of these compounds on worker health was even worse than the low-level exposure plants and animals received in the wild. On January 23, 1968, President Lyndon B. Johnson submitted a comprehensive occupational health and safety bill to Congress. Led by the United States Chamber of Commerce and the National Association of Manufacturers, the legislation was widely opposed by business. Many labor leaders, including the leadership of the AFL–CIO, supported the legislation, including testifying in support at congressional hearings. The legislation died in committee.

On April 14, 1969, President Richard Nixon introduced two bills into Congress which would have also protected worker health and safety. The Nixon legislation was much less prescriptive than the Johnson bill, and workplace health and safety regulation would be advisory rather than mandatory. However, Representative James G. O'Hara and Senator Harrison A. Williams introduced a much stricter bill similar to the Johnson legislation of the year before.

Companion legislation introduced in the House also imposed an all-purpose "general duty" clause on the enforcing agency as well. With the stricter approach of the Democratic bill apparently favored by a majority of both chambers, and unions now strongly supporting a bill, Republicans introduced a new, competing bill. The compromise bill established the independent research and standard-setting board favored by Nixon, while creating a new enforcement agency. The compromise bill also gave the Department of Labor the power to litigate on the enforcement agency's behalf (as in the Democratic bill). In November 1970, both chambers acted: The House passed the Republican compromise bill, while the Senate passed the stricter Democratic bill (which now included the general duty clause).

A conference committee considered the final bill in early December 1970. Union leaders pressured members of the conference committee to place the standard-setting function in the Department of Labor rather than an independent board. In return, unions agreed to let an independent review commission have veto power over enforcement actions. Unions also agreed to removal of a provision in the legislation which would have let the Secretary of Labor shut down plants or stop manufacturing procedures which put workers in "imminent danger" of harm. In exchange for a Republican proposal to establish an independent occupational health and safety research agency, Democrats won inclusion of the "general duty" clause and the right for union representatives to accompany a federal inspector during inspections. The conference committee bill passed both chambers on December 17, 1970, and President Nixon signed the bill on December 29, 1970. According to the New York Times, labor and environment activist Tony Mazzocchi was a "principal force behind the legislation".

The Act went into effect on April 28, 1971 (now celebrated as Workers' Memorial Day by American labor unions).

== Description ==
In passing the Act, Congress declared its intent "to assure so far as possible every working man and woman in the Nation safe and healthful working conditions and to preserve our human resources."

The Act created the Occupational Safety and Health Administration (OSHA), an agency of the Department of Labor. OSHA was given the authority both to set and enforce workplace health and safety standards. The Act also created the independent Occupational Safety and Health Review Commission to review enforcement priorities, actions and cases.

The Act also established the National Institute for Occupational Safety and Health (NIOSH), an independent research institute in the then Department of Health, Education & Welfare now under-Centers for Disease Control and Prevention.

The Act defines an employer to be any "person engaged in a business affecting commerce who has employees, but does not include the United States or any state or political subdivision of a State." The Act applies to employers as diverse as manufacturers, construction companies, law firms, hospitals, charities, labor unions and private schools.

Churches and other religious organizations are covered if they employ workers for secular purposes. The Act excludes the self-employed, family farms, workplaces covered by other federal laws (such as mining, nuclear weapons manufacture, railroads and airlines) and state and local governments (unless state law permits otherwise). The Act covers federal agencies and the United States Postal Service.

Section 5 of the Act contains the "general duty clause." The "general duty clause" requires employers to 1) Maintain conditions or adopt practices reasonably necessary and appropriate to protect workers on the job; 2) Be familiar with and comply with standards applicable to their establishments; and 3) Ensure that employees have and use personal protective equipment when required for safety and health. OSHA has established regulations for when it may act under the "general duty clause." The four criteria are 1) There must be a hazard; 2) The hazard must be a recognized hazard (e.g., the employer knew or should have known about the hazard, the hazard is obvious, or the hazard is a recognized one within the industry); 3) The hazard could cause or is likely to cause serious harm or death; and 4) The hazard must be correctable (OSHA recognizes not all hazards are correctable).

Although theoretically a powerful tool against workplace hazards, it is difficult to meet all four criteria. Therefore, OSHA has engaged in extensive regulatory rule-making to meet its obligations under the law.

Due to the difficulty of the rule-making process (which is governed by the Administrative Procedure Act), OSHA has focused on basic mechanical and chemical hazards rather than procedures. Major areas which its standards currently cover are: Toxic substances, harmful physical agents, electrical hazards, fall hazards, hazards associated with trenches and digging, hazardous waste, infectious disease, fire and explosion dangers, dangerous atmospheres, machine hazards, and confined spaces.

Section 8 of the Act covers reporting requirements. All employers must report to OSHA within eight hours if an employee dies from a work-related incident, or three or more employees are hospitalized as a result of a work-related incident. Additionally, all fatal on-the-job heart attacks must also be reported. Section 8 permits OSHA inspectors to enter, inspect and investigate, during regular working hours, any workplace covered by the Act. Employers must also communicate with employees about hazards in the workplace. By regulation, OSHA requires that employers keep a record of every non-consumer chemical product used in the workplace. Detailed technical bulletins called material safety data sheets (MSDSs) must be posted and available for employees to read and use to avoid chemical hazards. OSHA also requires employers to report on every injury or job-related illness requiring medical treatment (other than first aid) on OSHA Form 300, "Log of Work-Related Injuries and Illnesses" (known as an "OSHA Log" or "Form 300"). An annual summary is also required and must be posted for three months, and records must be kept for at least five years.

Section 11(c) of the Act prohibits any employer from discharging, retaliating or discriminating against any employee because the worker has exercised rights under the Act. These rights include complaining to OSHA and seeking an OSHA inspection, participating in an OSHA inspection, and participating or testifying in any proceeding related to an OSHA inspection.

Section 18 of the Act permits and encourages states to adopt their own occupational safety and health plans, so long as the state standards and enforcement "are or will be at least as effective in providing safe and healthful employment" as the federal OSH Act. States that have such plans are known as "OSHA States." As of 2007, 22 states and territories operated complete plans and four others had plans that covered only the public sector.

== Other Important Info ==
- United States labor law
- Factory Acts (UK)
- Occupational Safety and Health Act 1994 (Malaysia)
- Hazard prevention
- Health and Safety at Work etc. Act 1974 (UK)
- Occupational fatality
