= Occupational Safety and Health Act (Kenya) =

Occupational Safety and Health Act is the primary law governing workplace health and safety in Kenya. The Act specifies duties of employers, employees, regulators, and sets rules on registration of workplaces, accident reporting, enforcement, and health standards. It was enacted as Act No. 15 of 2007. It received presidential assent in October 2007. It was published in the Kenya Gazette on 9 November 2007. The legislation was subsequently amended by the Business Laws (Amendment) Act, 2020.

== History ==
The Occupational Safety and Health Act replaced the Factories Act, which had previously provided the principal statutory framework for workplace safety and health in Kenya. The transition formed part of the broader reform of Kenya's labor-law framework during the 2000s. The legislation forms part of Kenya's wider labor-law system, alongside several other acts.

== Provisions ==
The Act sets out duties of employers, occupiers and employees concerning workplace safety, training, personal protective equipment and the prevention of occupational risks. It also provides for the registration and inspection of workplaces, machinery safety, hazardous substances, occupational health and workplace welfare.

== Administration and enforcement ==
The Act establishes the National Council for Occupational Safety and Health and provides the legal framework for the Directorate of Occupational Safety and Health Services (DOSHS). The DOSHS is responsible for workplace inspections, registration, accident investigations, machinery examination and enforcement of occupational safety and health requirements.

The Act operates alongside the Work Injury Benefits Act, 2007, which provides for compensation for work-related injuries and occupational diseases.
