= Enterprise Europe Network =

European business network

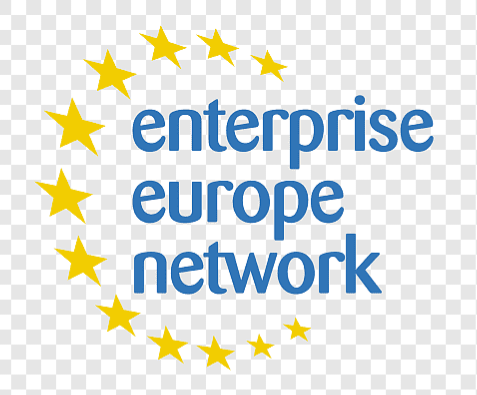
- Founded: February 7, 2008; 18 years ago
- Founder: Günter Verheugen
- Type: Business network
- Location: Brussels, Belgium
- Website: een.ec.europa.eu

The Enterprise Europe Network is a cross-border business network that provides support for small and medium enterprises (SMEs) to innovate and grow internationally. It is co-funded by the European Union's COSME and Horizon Europe programmes.

The network is active in more than 60 countries worldwide and brings together over 3,000 experts from more than 600 member organisations, including chambers of commerce and industry, technopoles, innovation support organisations, universities and research institutes, and regional development organisations.

== History ==
The Enterprise Europe Network was launched on 7 February 2008 by former EU Commissioner Günter Verheugen, combining the former Euro Info Centres and the Innovation Relay Centres.

From 2008 to 2014, the network was co-financed by the EU's Competitiveness and Innovation Framework Programme (CIP), in cooperation with institutions at national and regional levels.

From 2015 to 2020, the network was co-financed under the European Union's programme for the competitiveness of SMEs (COSME) and Horizon 2020.

Under the responsibility of the European Commission's Directorate-General for Internal Market, Industry, Entrepreneurship and SMEs, the Enterprise Europe Network is managed by the Executive Agency for Small and Medium-sized Enterprises (EASME).

== Advice for international growth ==
Enterprise Europe Network advisory services support businesses seeking to expand into international markets. The services cover a wide range of regulatory areas and market intelligence:

- Compliance with EU regulations and standards (e.g. CE marking)
- Access to international markets (market intelligence and capacity building)
- International public contracts (access to cross-border procurement and EU tender opportunities)
- National and regional finance and funding (identification of sources of finance and investor-readiness training)
- EU funding schemes and application support
- Intellectual property rights (IPR) – patents and IPR applications and exploitation strategies
- Energy and resource efficiency (identification of technologies and finance opportunities)
- Management improvement (capacity building)

== Support for business innovation ==
The network's innovation support services are available based on an assessment of the needs and development phase of the business.

At an entry level, network services include:

- Information on innovation-related policies, legislation and support programmes
- Links with local innovation stakeholders
- Information about access to local sources of funding

Network experts can provide one-to-one services to support innovation capacity building. Such services include innovation audits, advice on intellectual property, marketing, and access to finance.

The network also provides key account management services to businesses benefitting from the Horizon 2020 SME instrument programme, part of the European Innovation Council (EIC) pilot.
