= Château d'Oche (Saint-Priest-les-Fougères) =

Coordinates: 45.527778°N 1.0319444°E

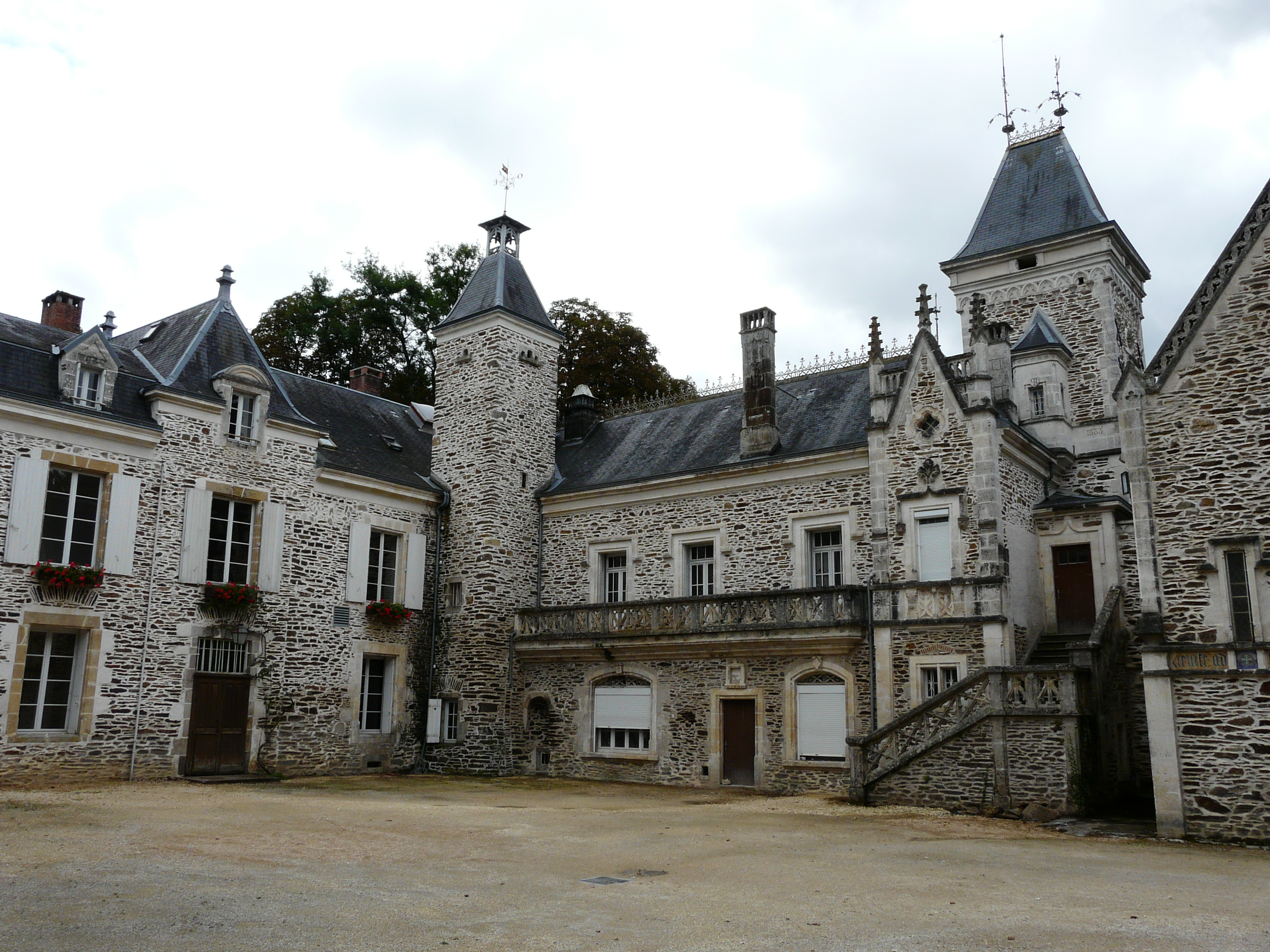
- Interior Courtyard of the Château d'Oche.
- Interactive map of Château d'Oche

General information
- Type: Château
- Architectural style: Neo-Medieval
- Location: Saint-Priest-les-Fougères, Dordogne, Nouvelle-Aquitaine, France

Website
- http://chateau-oche.com/

Château d'Oche is a château in Saint-Priest-les-Fougères, Dordogne, Nouvelle-Aquitaine, France. The castle was originally constructed in the 15th century, and was rebuilt in the 19th century, and is
