= Occupational Health and Safety Act 2000 =

Repealed statute of New South Wales, Australia

Parliament of New South Wales
- Long title: An Act to secure the health, safety and welfare of persons at work; to repeal the Occupational Health and Safety Act 1983; and for other purposes
- Citation: 2000 No. 40
- Enacted by: Parliament of New South Wales

Repeals
- Occupational Health and Safety Act 1983

Related legislation
- Work Health and Safety Act 2011
- Status: Repealed

The Occupational Health and Safety Act 2000 is a repealed statute of New South Wales (NSW). The Act was repealed by the Work Health and Safety Act 2011.

The NSW Occupational Health and Safety Act 2000, No 40. (OHS Act) provides the rules and legislation to be abided by all workplaces, to ensure the health, safety and welfare of all persons at work in the state of New South Wales, Australia.

The full OHS Act 2000, including regulations, reviews and amendments can be found at the NSW Legislation website.

== Long title ==
"An Act to secure the health, safety and welfare of persons at work; to repeal the Occupational Health and Safety Act 1983; and for other purposes."

== Introduction ==
The Act was agreed upon on 2 June 2000 and commenced on 1 September 2001. This Act replaced the previous OHS Act 1983 and contains new provisions that require employers to consult with employees on health, safety and welfare matters. The OHS Act is implemented by WorkCover NSW, and applies to all workplaces in NSW, (except as otherwise stated in the Act). Through WorkCover, industry codes of practice are made under the OHS Act, which provide practical guidance and advice on how to achieve the standards required by the OHS Act and the Occupational Health and Safety Regulation 2001. The Minister responsible for the OHS Act, including the approval of the codes of practice is the Minister for Finances and Services. The Minister for Resources and Energy is responsible for sections of the Act that relate to coal or mining workplaces . The specific roles and functions of WorkCover are set out in the Workplace Injury Management and Workers Compensation Act 1998 . WorkCover can also provide assistance, education, and advice on interpretation of guidelines and issuing of guidelines of the OHS Act and related Regulations.

== Objectives ==
The objectives of the OHS Act are:

- to secure and promote the health, safety and welfare of people at work,
- to protect people at a place of work against risks to health or safety,
- to promote a safe and healthy work environment that protects workers from injury and illness and that is adapted to their physiological and psychological needs,
- to provide for consultation and co-operation between employers and employees in achieving the objects of this Act,
- to ensure that risks to health and safety at a place of work are identified, assessed and eliminated or controlled,
- to develop and promote community awareness of occupational health and safety issues,
- to provide a legislative framework that allows for progressively higher standards of occupational health and safety that take account of changes in technology and work practices,
- to deal with the impact of particular classes or types of dangerous goods.

== Summary ==
The Act provides:

- General requirements for health, safety and welfare, which must be met by all places of work in NSW
- Definitions of employees and employers, what classifies as a “risk” at work
- Rules on the duties of the employers and employees to ensure occupational health and safety,
- Rules on the duty to consult on OHS related issues, to provide OHS committees and an OHS representative, and to liaise with a WorkCover representative whenever necessary
- Rules regarding the unlawful dismissal or victimisation of an employee and guidelines on compensation claims
- Industry Codes of Practice
- Guidelines on the appointment of WorkCover Inspectors and the powers of inspectors related to entry onto premises, inspections and representing employees, providing inspection, improvement and prohibition notices
- Guidelines on criminal and other proceedings; penalties and sentencing

== Legal Implementation of the OHS Act 2000 ==
Any breaches of the OHS Act and its Regulations may be dealt within a court of Law. The OHS Act may also provide assistance to the Courts in making decisions regarding penalties. For example, in the Industrial Court of NSW, cases were heard regarding an incident at an Oil Seed extraction industry where a bin caught fire, causing explosions which led to the injury of workers and members of the fire brigade, including fatal burns.

Investigations were carried out by WorkCover Australia and prosecutions brought against the Oil Seed Company, Caines Pty Limited and Ors, and the NSW Fire Brigade. The Court found that the employer Caines Pty, the managers of this company and the NSW Fire Brigade had breached Sections 15(1) and 16(1) of the OHS Act and had failed to ensure the health, safety and welfare of their employees. Penalties were decided upon based on section 12 of the OHS Act. A full description of the cases and the outcomes can be found at LawLink NSW - The NSW Industrial Relations Commission Judicial Decisions website

== Regulations and related Legislation ==
To date, only one Regulation has been made under the Act, The Occupational Health and Safety Regulation 2001. This Regulation commenced on 1 September 2001 and applies to all places of work except where otherwise stated in the Regulation. This Regulation consolidates previous Regulations, for example those related to Manual Handling and Hazardous substances.

The Regulation contains guidelines on risk management, workplace consultation, hazardous substances and processes, certification, licenses and permits, among other important matters.

There are many other associated legislation in NSW which also contain legal requirements regarding health and safety at work, including the Workers Compensation and Injury Management legislation, the Dangerous Goods Act 1975 and the Poisons and Therapeutic Goods Act 1966.

It was repealed by the Work Health and Safety Act 2011 as of 1 January 2012.

== See also ==
- Safe Work Australia – Government agency responsible for work health and safety
- Industrial manslaughter – Culpable conduct within a company that leads to a person's death
