= Seest fireworks disaster =

Fireworks warehouse explosion in Denmark in 2004

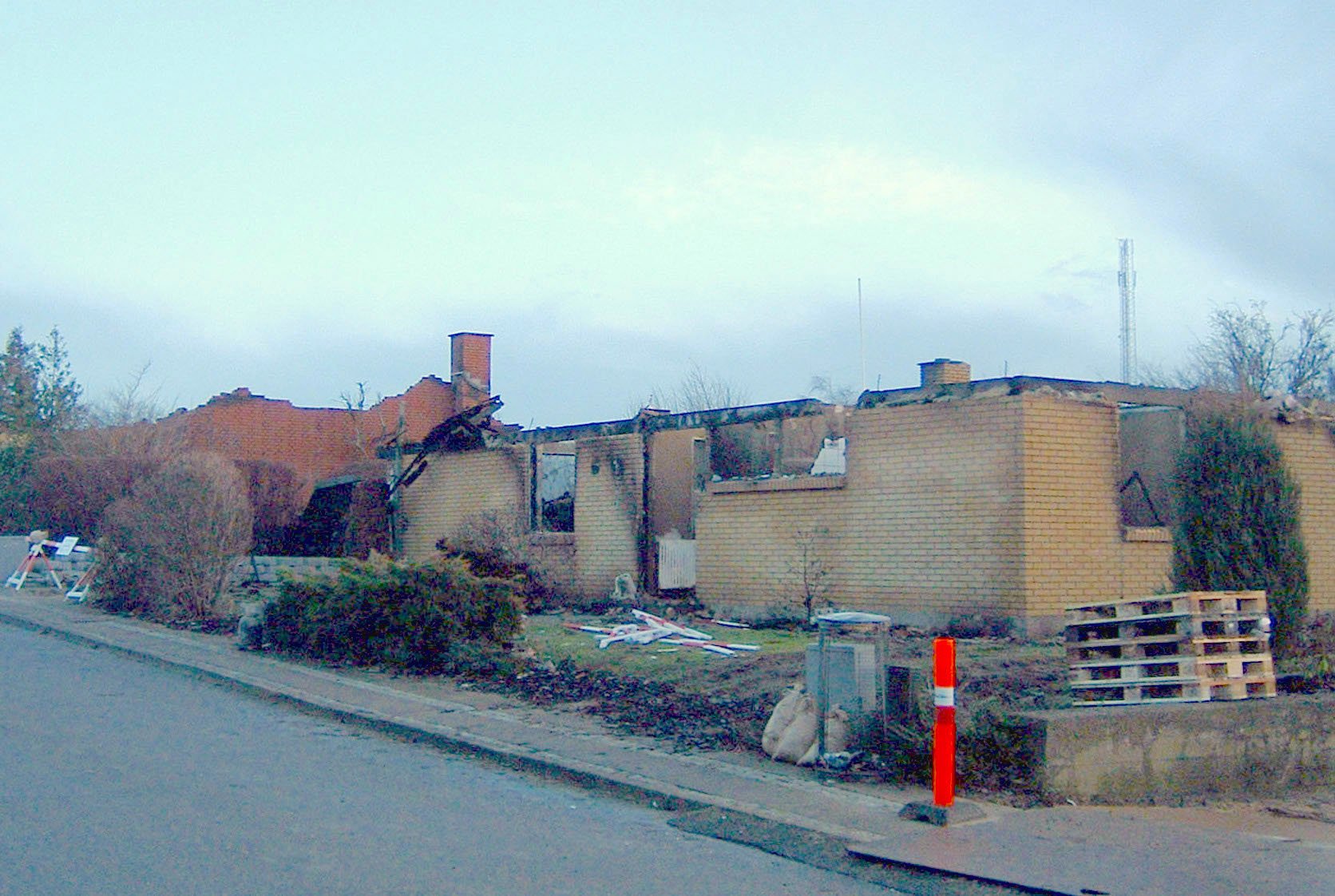
- Houses destroyed by the explosion and fire
- Date: 3 November 2004; 21 years ago
- Time: 17:45 CET
- Location: Seest, Kolding, Denmark; 55°29′16″N 9°26′11″E
- Type: Fireworks disaster
- Cause: Accident
- Deaths: 1
- Injuries: 24

The fireworks accident in Seest was a disaster that occurred on 3 November 2004, when the N. P. Johnsens Fyrværkerifabrik fireworks warehouse exploded in Seest, a suburb of Kolding, Denmark. One firefighter died, and seven from the rescue team as well as 17 locals were injured. In addition 34 rescuers, 8 police officers, and 27 from the Danish Emergency Management Agency were treated for smoke inhalation. The evacuation of 2,000 people from the immediate surrounding area saved many lives. Eight fire and rescue vehicles were also destroyed.

The surrounding area was hit hard by the explosion, with 355 houses reported damaged, and 176 of them rendered uninhabitable. Altogether, 2,107 buildings were damaged by the explosion, with the cost of the damage rounding to an estimated € 100 million.

N. P. Johnsens fyrværkerifabrik was the main importer of fireworks in Denmark at the time, accounting for 25% of the total trade. At the time of the disaster, the company was storing 284 net tons (net explosive mass) of fireworks in its warehouse, the maximum it was allowed to store was 300 tons.

Following the disaster, there was an investigation. Initially, it was thought that the factory had stored significantly more than it was allowed to. However, this was later denied by the authorities who concluded that the disaster was due to an accident which the factory was not responsible for. When working inside a container, two employees had accidentally dropped a box containing fireworks, which had caused the fireworks to ignite. The two employees had to flee the container. Once the fire crew arrived, they initially thought that they were dealing with a simple container fire. However, the blaze was too intense, and they were unsuccessful when trying to put it out. Since the firemen had to flee the scene as well, once it became apparent that the container would explode, the rest of the fireworks were eventually ignited as well, causing further violent explosions.
