= Château d'Oche (mountain) =

Mountain in France

- Location within France

Highest point
- Elevation: 2,197 m (7,208 ft)
- Coordinates: 46°21′00″N 06°44′35″E

Geography
- Location: Haute-Savoie, France
- Parent range: Chablais Alps

Château d'Oche (2,197 m) is a mountain in the Chablais Alps in Haute-Savoie, France.
