= Dent d'Oche =

Mountain in France

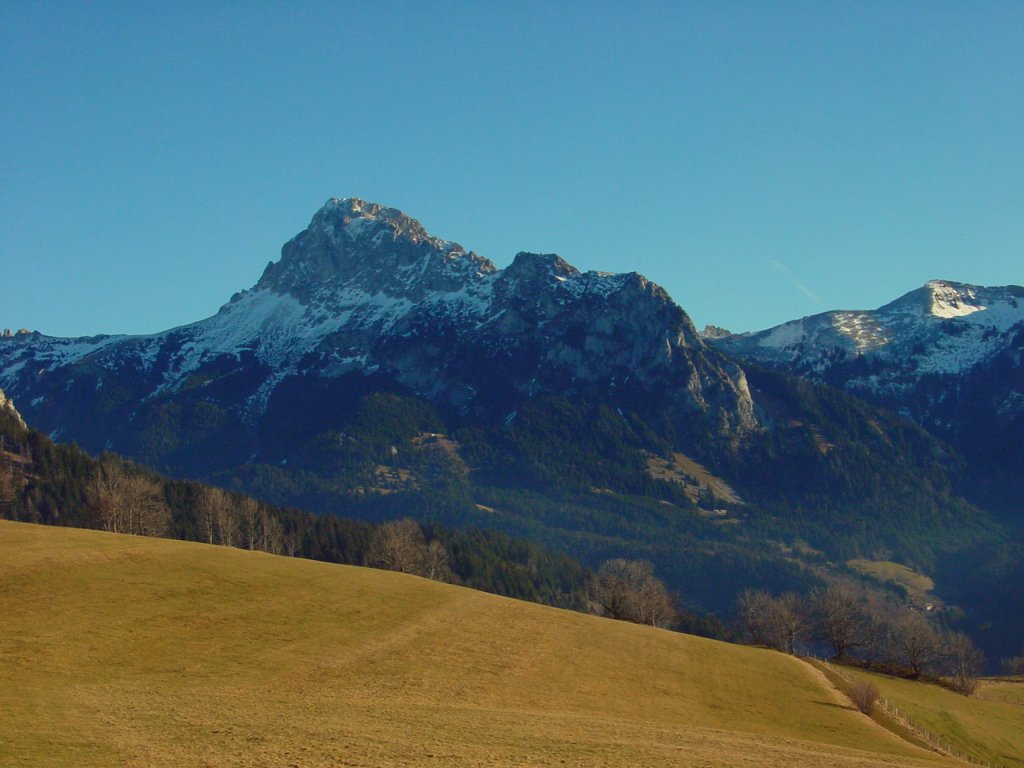

Highest point
- Elevation: 2,221 m (7,287 ft)
- Prominence: 307 m (1,007 ft)
- Parent peak: Cornettes de Bise
- Coordinates: 46°21′11″N 06°43′52″E

Geography
- Location within Alps
- Location of the main peaks Mouse over (or touch) gives more detail of peaks. Location in the Alps
- Location: Haute-Savoie, France
- Parent range: Chablais Alps

The Dent d'Oche (French pronunciation: [dɑ̃ dɔʃ]) is a mountain in the department of Haute-Savoie, France, in the Chablais Alps, near the Swiss-French border, that rises to 2,221 m (7,287 ft) in altitude. It towers above Évian, Thonon, and Lake Geneva. It offers a view of the French and Swiss Alps and the Swiss prealps.

It is the northernmost summit above 2,000 m (6,600 ft) in France.

About 100 m (330 ft) below the summit is a refuge of the French Alpine Club, the refuge de la Dent d'Oche.

In summer, the refuge and the summit can be reached by a hike that is doable without special equipment, but significantly more difficult than the usual routes to nearby peaks such as Cornettes de Bise and Le Grammont. Reaching the refuge involves some short climbing sections for which chains are provided. The hike from the refuge up to the summit involves some unsecured sections along a cliff, where a misstep would be fatal.

There is an alternative hiking route to the summit, from the east, that is even more delicate.

Finally, the north face route, with a rise of 350 m (1,150 ft), is one of the most difficult climbs of the Chablais Alps. Certain sections require extensive technical skill. The first ascent of the north face was achieved by Joseph Ravanel, his siblings Arthur and Camille and François Jacquier on 6 June 1925.
