= Enschede fireworks disaster =

2000 explosion in the Netherlands

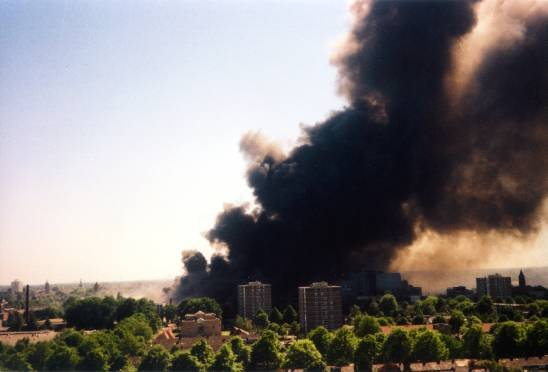
- The suburb of Roombeek on fire
- Date: 13 May 2000; 26 years ago
- Time: c. 15:00 CEST (UTC+02:00)
- Location: Enschede, Netherlands; 52°13′49″N 6°53′36″E
- Type: Fireworks disaster
- Deaths: 23 (22 directly, 1 indirectly)
- Injuries: 950
- Property damage: 400 homes destroyed; 1,500 buildings damaged

The Enschede fireworks disaster was a catastrophic fireworks explosion on 13 May 2000 in Enschede, Netherlands. The explosion killed 23 people, (Note: 22 directly, 1 indirectly) including four firefighters, and injured 950 others. A total of 400 homes were destroyed and 1,500 buildings damaged.

The first explosion had a strength in the order of 0.8 tons of TNT (3.3 GJ), and the final explosion was in the range of 4–5 tons of TNT (17–21 GJ). The largest blast was felt as far as the city of Deventer, 50 kilometres (31 mi) away. Fire crews were called in from across the border in Germany to help battle the blaze; it was brought under control by the end of the day.

S.E. Fireworks was a major supplier to pop concerts and major festive events in the Netherlands. Prior to the disaster it had a good safety record and had passed all safety audits.

== Cause ==
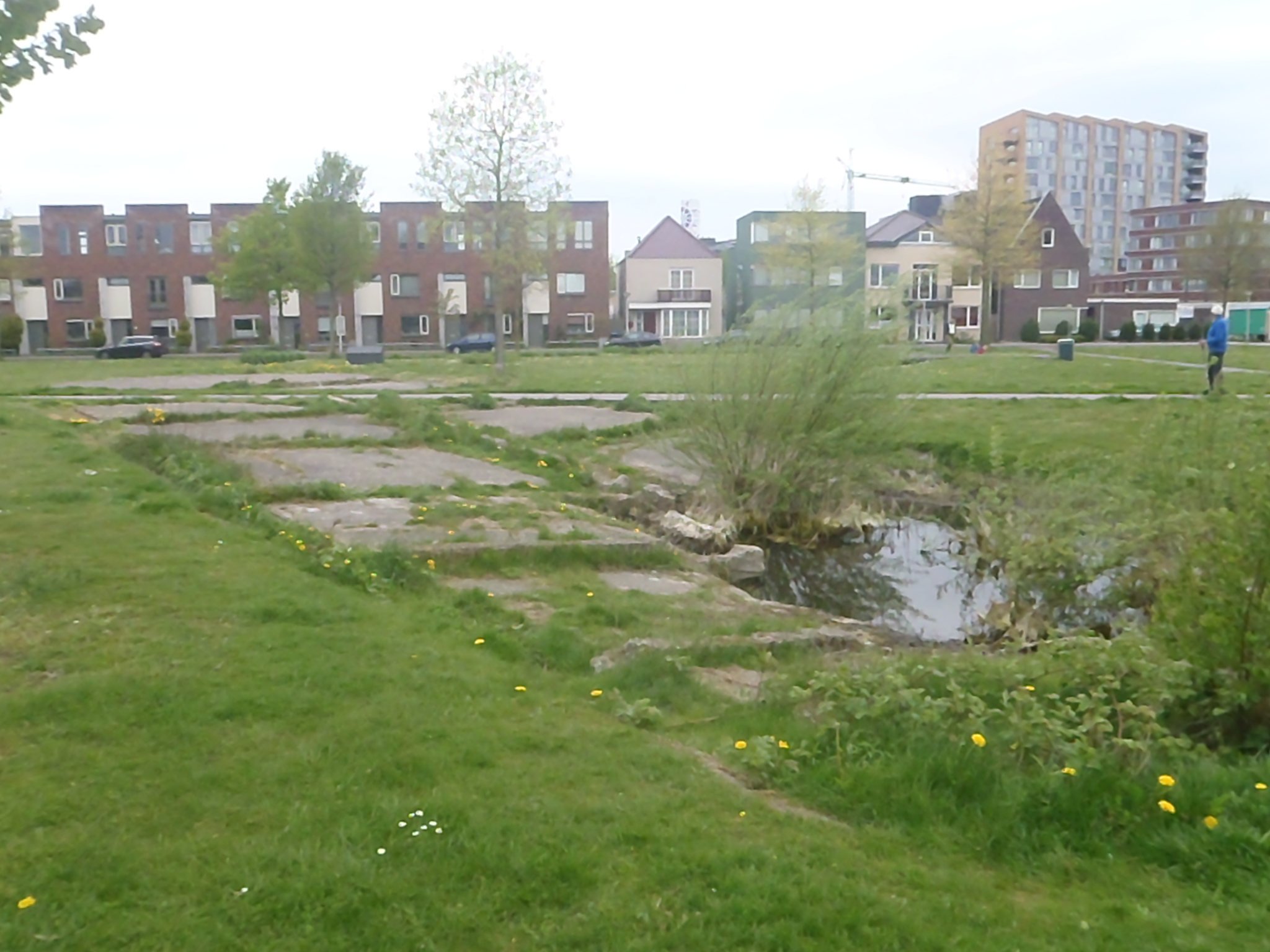
Crater created by the explosion

The fire which triggered the explosion is believed to have started inside the central building of the S.E. Fireworks depot, in a work area where some 900 kg (2,000 lb) of fireworks were stored. It then spread outside the building to two shipping containers which were being illegally used to store more fireworks. The fire then spread to other portions of the complex, culminating in the final detonation of approximately 177 tonnes (174 long tons; 195 short tons) of fireworks, which destroyed much of the surrounding neighborhood.

One theory put forward to explain the large scale of the disaster was that internal fire doors in the central complex—which may have otherwise contained the fire—had been left open. The assessment prior to the disaster was that an explosion was unlikely because the fireworks were stored in sealed bunkers specifically designed to minimize such risk. However, the illegal use of additional shipping containers had not been factored into this assessment. These containers were located close together at ground level and had not been separated by earthworks or other partitioning, greatly increasing the risk of disaster

One week prior to the explosion, S.E. had been audited and had all the necessary permits to store the estimated 100 tonnes of fireworks that exploded. After the explosion, residents from the affected district of Roombeek—a poor, working-class neighbourhood—complained of government inaction, saying the disaster had been waiting to happen.

The S.E. Fireworks factory was the only such facility in the Netherlands located in a residential area. When it was built in 1977, the warehouse was outside the town, but it became surrounded by low-income housing. Residents and town councillors said they did not know there was a fireworks warehouse in their area. During the court case, the judge said city officials failed to act even when they knew laws had been broken. They acted "completely incomprehensibly" by allowing the company to expand, for fear that the city would have to pay the cost of moving S.E. Fireworks to another location.

== Damage ==
A 40-hectare (100-acre; 0.4 km^{2}) area around the warehouse was largely destroyed by the blast, and was subsequently cleared and reconstructed . Around 400 houses were destroyed and 1,500 homes damaged, leaving 1,250 people homeless. Ten thousand residents were evacuated, and damages neared 1 billion guilders (€454 million).

The Dutch Government warned that potentially harmful asbestos was released into the air after the fire spread to the nearby Grolsch Beer brewery, which had an asbestos roof. The brewery was subsequently demolished and a replacement opened in the nearby village of Boekelo in 2004.

== Death toll ==
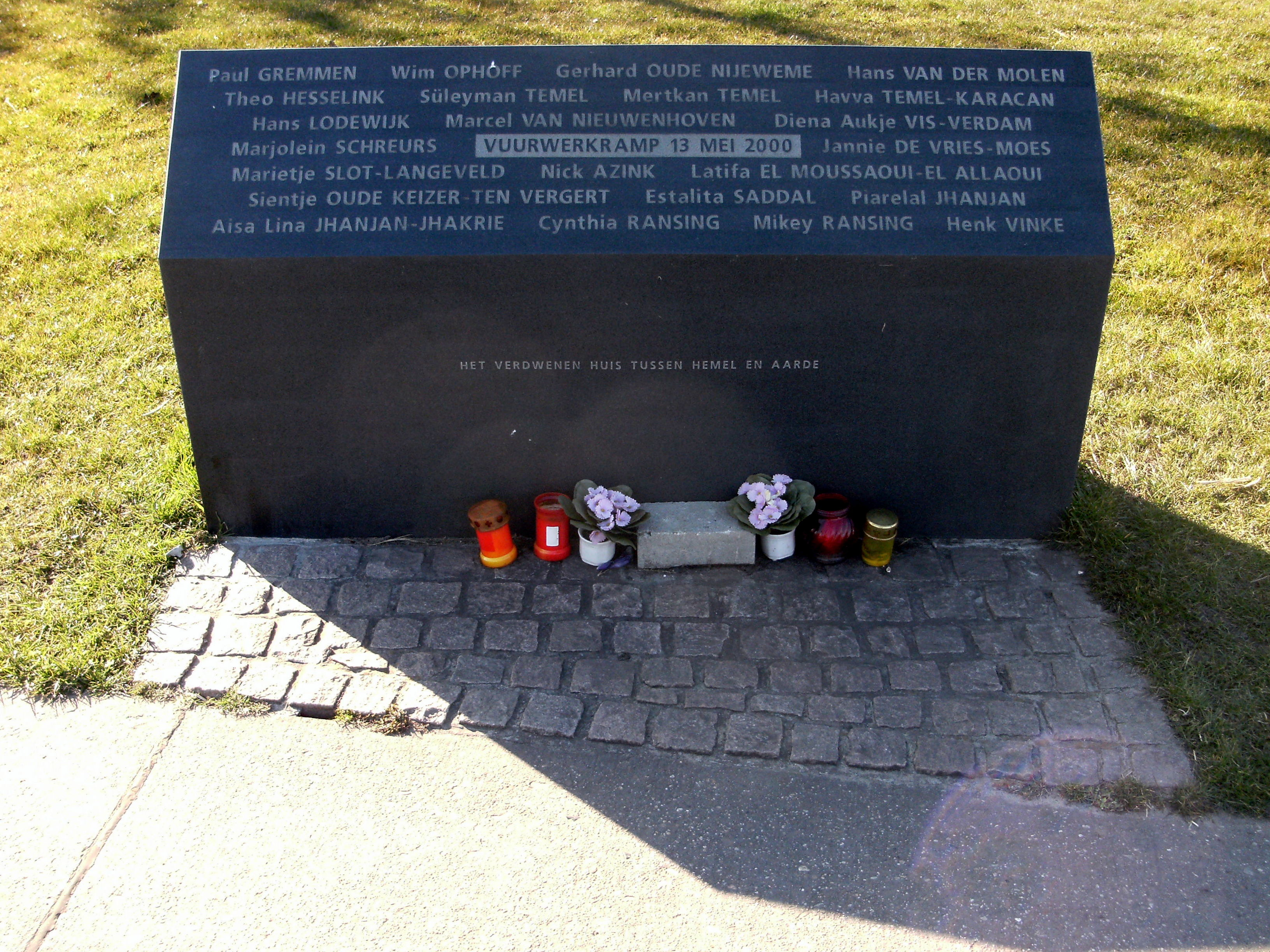
Memorial at the site of the disaster on which the names of the dead are engraved

By 22 May 2000, 18 people had been confirmed dead, including an elderly woman who died from her injuries in a hospital on 21 May. On 24 May, the search for victims ended with three people still missing and presumed dead. A 19th victim died from her injuries in a hospital on 19 October 2000. The addition of the three missing people to the death toll brought the total to 22. In 2005, Dutch media reported that a 26-year-old Enschede resident who had died in a local hospital on 2 October 2000 was unofficially being recognized as the 23rd victim of the disaster. Her widower clarified in an interview that while she sustained only minor injuries on the day of the disaster, she developed an eating disorder in the months thereafter, and that her doctor reported a "direct connection" between her death and the disaster. A memorial at the site lists her name along with the official 22 victims.

== Healthcare impact ==
A 2005 survey based on general practitioners' medical records compared 9,329 victims with a control sample size of 7,329 units, ranging from 16 months before to 2.5 years after the disaster.

The study highlighted that "two and a half years post-disaster the prevalence of psychological problems in victims, who had to relocate, was about double and in the non-relocated victims one-third more than controls". Relocated victims showed the highest increase of medically unexplained physical symptoms (tiredness, headache, nausea, and abdominal pain) and of gastrointestinal morbidity.

== Legal proceedings ==
On 20 May, Dutch authorities issued an international arrest warrant for the two managers of the company, Rudi Bakker and Willie Pater, after they fled their homes, which were empty when searched. Pater handed himself in on the same day, and Bakker the day after.

In April 2002, the owners were sentenced to six months' imprisonment each for violation of environmental and safety regulations and dealing in illegal fireworks, along with a fine of €2,250 each. They were acquitted of the more serious charges of negligence for the fire. After four-and-a-half-years of legal battle their sentences were increased to 12 months each in February 2005.

In May 2002 Almelo Court convicted 36-year-old André de Vries of arson and sentenced him to 15 years imprisonment. He was acquitted by Arnhem Appeals Court in May 2003.

€8.5m in compensation was awarded to victims after assessment of 3,519 claims. Three hundred people were compensated for extra costs, 136 people for loss of income, and 1,477 people for health problems.

== Dutch fire safety regulations ==
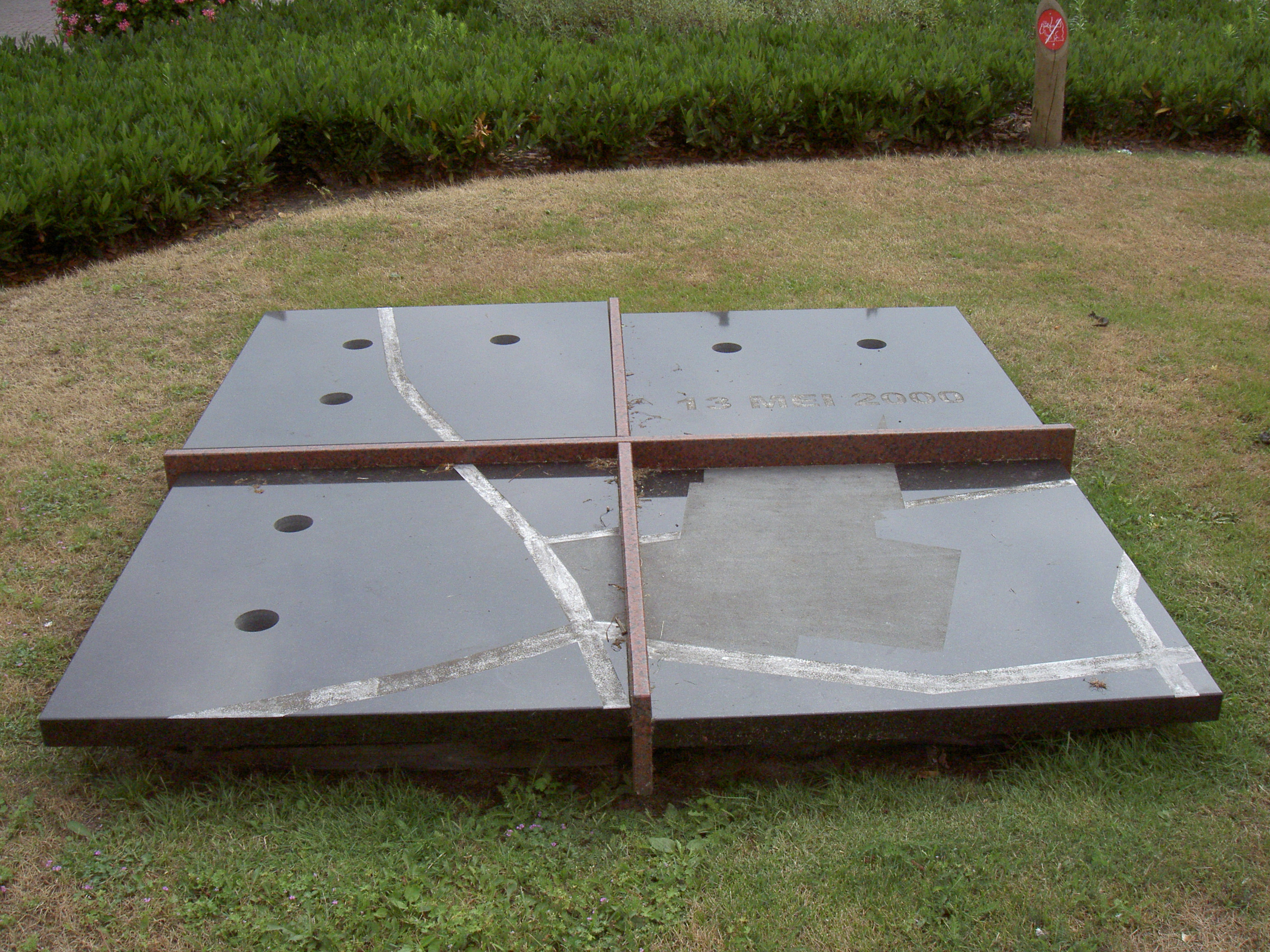
A memorial of the disaster, outlining devastated areas around S.E. Fireworks

The disaster led to intensified safety regulations in the Netherlands concerning the storage and sale of fireworks. The Roombeek area was rebuilt. Three illegal Netherlands fireworks depots were closed down.

== Memorials ==
There have been annual public memorial services in Roombeek since 2000 led by the mayor Jan Mans, and commonly ending on the Stroinksbleekweg. The theme of 2004 was "homecoming".

In 2005 a memorial was unveiled at the site of the disaster, titled 'Het verdwenen huis tussen hemel en aarde' (The vanished house between heaven and earth) by Moldavian artist Pavel Balta. Part of the memorial consists of the floor of the former storage depot, crushed into the crater created by the explosion.

== In popular culture ==
The disaster is the subject of the season 2 episode of Blueprint for Disaster, called "Explosion at Enschede".

The events inspired the mission "Explosion in fireworks factory" in the video game, Emergency 4: Global Fighters for Life.

== See also ==
- 1654 Delft gunpowder explosion
- Leiden gunpowder disaster (1807)
- 2000 in the Netherlands
- List of fireworks accidents and incidents
- List of industrial disasters
