= Occupational Safety and Health Act 1994 =

Parliament of Malaysia
- Long title: An Act to make further provisions for securing the safety, health and welfare of persons at work, for protecting others against risks to safety or health in connection with the activities of persons at work, to establish the National Council for Occupational Safety and Health, and for matters connected therewith.
- Citation: Act 514
- Territorial extent: Malaysia
- Passed by: Dewan Rakyat
- Passed: 20 October 1993
- Passed by: Dewan Negara
- Passed: 16 December 1993
- Royal assent: 15 February 1994
- Commenced: 24 February 1994
- Effective: 25 February 1994

Legislative history

First chamber: Dewan Rakyat
- Bill title: Occupational Safety and Health Bill 1993
- Bill citation: D.R. 26/1993
- Introduced by: M. Mahalingam, Deputy Minister of Human Resources
- First reading: 18 October 1993
- Second reading: 19 October 1993
- Third reading: 20 October 1993

Second chamber: Dewan Negara
- Bill title: Occupational Safety and Health Bill 1993
- Bill citation: D.R. 26/1993
- Member(s) in charge: M. Mahalingam, Deputy Minister of Human Resources
- First reading: 13 December 1993
- Second reading: 16 December 1993
- Third reading: 16 December 1993

Related legislation
- Merchant Shipping Ordinance 1952 [Ord. No. 70 of 1952] Merchant Shipping Ordinance 1960 of Sabah [Sabah Ord. No. 11 of 1960] Merchant Shipping Ordinance 1960 of Sarawak [Sarawak Ord. No. 2 of 1960] Factories and Machinery Act 1967 [Act 139]

Keywords
- Occupational safety and health, occupational disease, occupational injury, work accident, safety culture
- Status: In force

The Occupational Safety and Health Act 1994 (Malay: Akta Keselamatan dan Kesihatan Pekerjaan 1994) is a piece of Malaysian legislation which governs the safety, health and welfare of workers during work.

The principle of the Act is "To make further provision for securing that safety, health and welfare of persons at work, for protecting others against risks to safety or health in connection with the activities of persons at work, to establish the National Council for Occupational Safety and Health and for matters connected therewith."

The Act applies throughout Malaysia to the industries specified in the First Schedule. Nothing in this act shall apply to work aboard ships governed by the Merchant Shipping Ordinance 1952 [Ord. No. 70 of 1952], the Merchant Shipping Ordinance 1960 of Sabah [Sabah Ord. No. 11 of 1960] or Sarawak [Sarawak Ord. No. 2 of 1960] or the armed forces.

== Structure ==
The Occupational Safety and Health Act 1994, in its current form (1 January 2006), consists of 15 Parts containing 67 sections and 3 schedules (including no amendment).

- Part I: Preliminary
- Part II: Appointment of Officers
- Part III: National Council for Occupational Safety and Health
- Part IV: General Duties of Employers and Self-Employed Persons
- Part V: General Duties of Designers, Manufacturers and Suppliers
- Part VI: General Duties of Employees
- Part VII: Safety and Health Organizations
- Part VIII: Notification of Accidents, Dangerous Occurrence, Occupational Poisoning and Occupational Diseases, and Inquiry
- Part IX: Prohibition against Use of Plant or Substance
- Part X: Industry Codes of Practice
- Part XI: Enforcement and Investigation
- Part XII: Liability for Offences
- Part XIII: Appeals
- Part XIV: Regulations
- Part XV: Miscellaneous
- Schedules

== List of regulations under this Act ==
1. Occupational Safety and Health (Employers' Safety and Health General Policy Statements) (Exception) Regulations 1995
2. Occupational Safety and Health (Control of Industry Major Accident Hazards) Regulations 1996
3. Occupational Safety and Health (Safety and Health Committee) Regulations 1996
4. ~~Occupational Safety and Health (Classification, Packaging and Labelling of Hazardous Chemicals) Regulations 1997~~ Repealed by the Occupational Safety and Health (Classification, Labelling and Safety Data Sheet of Hazardous Chemicals) Regulations 2013)
5. Occupational Safety and Health (Safety and Health Officer) Regulations 1997
6. Occupational Safety and Health (Safety and Health Officer) Order 1997
7. Occupational Safety and Health (Prohibition of Use of Substance) Order 1999
8. Occupational Safety and Health (Use and Standards of Exposure of Chemicals Hazardous to Health) Regulations 2000
9. Occupational Safety and Health (Notification of Accident, Dangerous Occurrence, Occupational Poisoning and Occupational Disease) Regulation 2004dd
10. Occupational Safety and Health (Noise Exposure) Regulations 2019

== National Council for Occupational Safety and Health ==
The National Council for Occupational Safety and Health was established in 1995. Its main objective is "to ensure the safety, health and welfare of employees in the workplace is secure".

== See also ==
- Occupational Safety and Health Act
