= List of building or structure fires =

This is a list of building or structure fires where a building or structure has caught fire. For major urban conflagrations, see List of town and city fires.

Notable building or structure fires
Pre-1500s
1500s
1600s
1700s
1800s
1900s
1910s:	1910	1911	1912	1913	1914	1915	1916	1917	1918	1919
1920s:	1920	1921	1922	1923	1924	1925	1926	1927	1928	1929
1930s:	1930	1931	1932	1933	1934	1935	1936	1937	1938	1939
1940s:	1940	1941	1942	1943	1944	1945	1946	1947	1948	1949
1950s:	1950	1951	1952	1953	1954	1955	1956	1957	1958	1959
1960s:	1960	1961	1962	1963	1964	1965	1966	1967	1968	1969
1970s:	1970	1971	1972	1973	1974	1975	1976	1977	1978	1979
1980s:	1980	1981	1982	1983	1984	1985	1986	1987	1988	1989
1990s:	1990	1991	1992	1993	1994	1995	1996	1997	1998	1999
2000s:	2000	2001	2002	2003	2004	2005	2006	2007	2008	2009
2010s:	2010	2011	2012	2013	2014	2015	2016	2017	2018	2019
2020s:	2020	2021	2022	2023	2024	2025	2026	2027	2028	2029

== Antiquity through Middle Ages ==
- 586 BC – First Temple in Jerusalem burned by Nebuchadnezzar, king of the Babylonians.
- 480 BC – Acropolis of Athens burnt during the second Persian invasion of Greece.
- 356 BC – Temple of Artemis at Ephesus, arson by Herostratus.
- 70 AD – Second Temple in Jerusalem burned by Roman Empire troops under general Titus.
- Library of Alexandria destroyed by fire. Evidence is scant for all four fires, but the library was eventually destroyed.
  - 48 BC – Library of Alexandria accidentally burned during siege by Julius Caesar.
  - 272 – Library of Alexandria possibly burned during the occupation of Alexandria.
  - 391 – Library of Alexandria possibly burned by order of Roman Emperor Theodosius I.
  - 642 – Later sources attribute burning to Caliph Omar during the Muslim conquest of Egypt.
- 192 AD – Fire of Rome (192).
- 1046 – Fire at St. Mary's Cathedral, Hildesheim, Germany.
- 1184 – Lightning causes a fire at McDermott's Castle, Ireland, with 120–140 deaths.
- 1190 – Fire at Clifford's Tower, York, England, killed at least 150 Jews.

== 16th century ==
- 1577 – Fire in the Doge's Palace, Venice, destroyed major works by Bellini, Titian and Tintoretto.

== 17th century ==
- 1613 – Globe Theatre in London. During the performance, cannon misfire caught the thatched roof on fire and the Theatre burned down.
- 1652 – Town hall of Amsterdam burnt down. Treasures and important historical charters were destroyed.
- 1671 – Much of the monastery of the Escorial outside Madrid burned in a fire lasting 15 days, destroying large numbers of artworks, books and manuscripts.
- 1697 – The medieval "Tre Kronor" Royal Castle in Stockholm burned down and was eventually replaced by the present palace.
- 1698 – The Tudor and Stuart Palace of Whitehall, London burned, except for Inigo Jones's Banqueting House. The ruins were demolished.

== 18th century ==
- 1727 – Fire during puppet show in barn at Burwell, Cambridgeshire, England, killed 78 (including 51 children).
- 1731 – Coudenberg Royal Palace, Brussels, destroyed and never rebuilt.
- 1734 – The Royal Palace of the Alcazar, Madrid, Spain burned on Christmas Eve. Eventually replaced by the present royal palace.
- 1772 – Hôtel-Dieu de Paris fire in Paris, France.
- 1794 – Christiansborg Palace, Copenhagen, Denmark.

== 19th century ==
- 1808 – Basilica of the Holy Sepulchre, Jerusalem. The fire caused the dome of the Rotunda to collapse, smashing the Edicule's exterior decoration.
- 1808 – First Royal Opera House fire in London, England.
- 1809 – St. James's Palace, London, England. Much of the south and east portions of the palace were destroyed and not rebuilt.
- 1810 – Austrian embassy fire (fr), Paris, France. Officially 1 dead, in reality at least 91.
- 1811 – Richmond Theatre fire, Richmond, Virginia. 72 dead.
- 1814 – The White House and United States Capitol in Washington, D.C. burned by the British.
- 1822 – Grue Church fire, Norway, 113–117 dead.
- 1823 – Basilica of Saint Paul Outside the Walls, Rome, Italy.

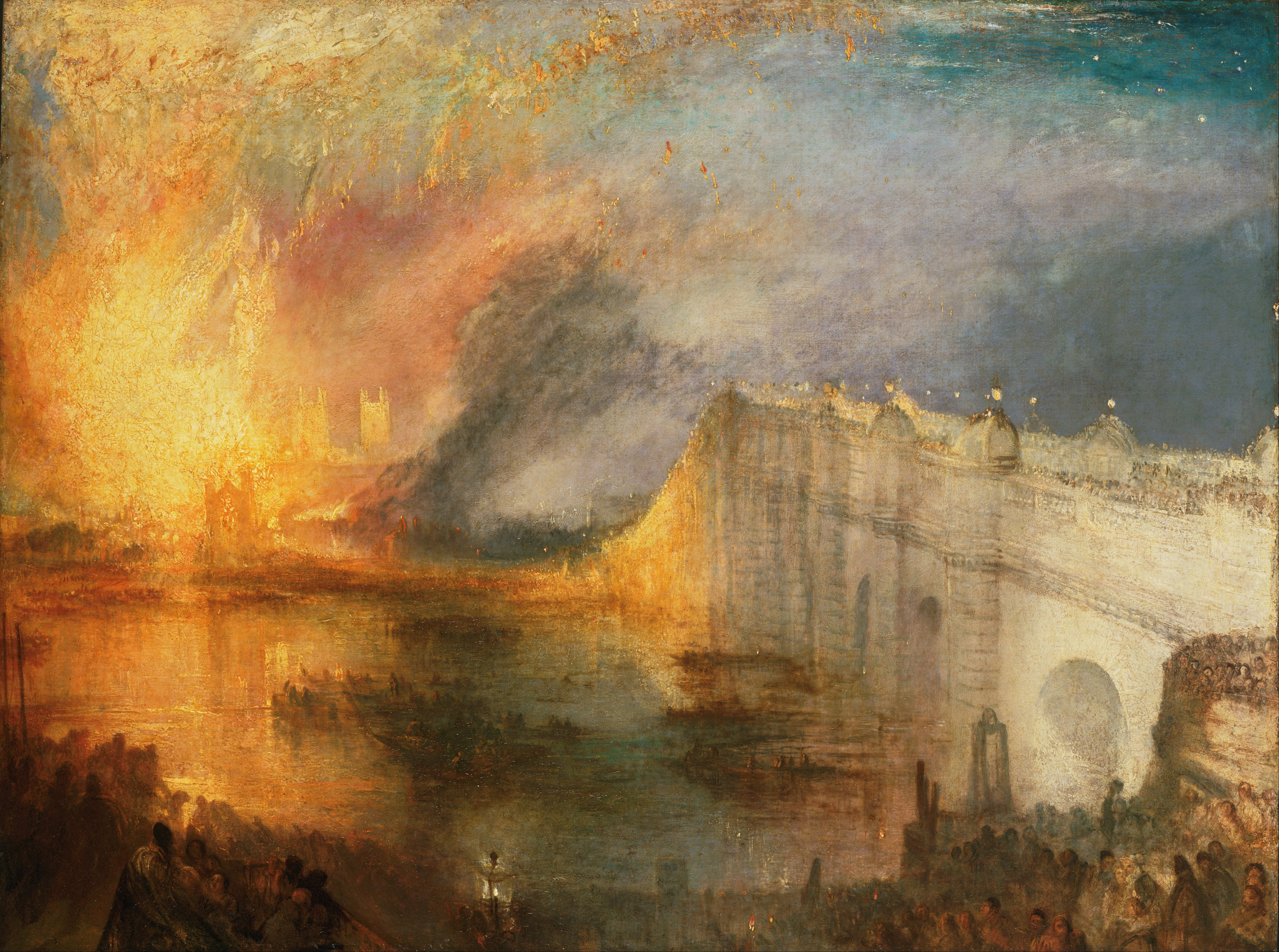
J. M. W. Turner watched the Palace of Westminster fire in 1834 and painted several canvases depicting it, including The Burning of the Houses of Lords and Commons (1835).

- 1834 – Burning of Parliament at the Palace of Westminster, home to Parliament of the United Kingdom.
- 1836 – First U.S. Patent Office fire in Blodget's Hotel.
- 1836 – Fire at Chartres Cathedral destroyed the sweet chestnut "forest" above the vaults.
- 1837 – The Winter Palace, St. Petersburg, Russia destroyed except for The Hermitage.
- 1844 – Separate fires at St. Michael's & St. Augustine's Roman Catholic Churches during the Philadelphia nativist riots, Philadelphia, Pennsylvania.
- 1845 – Theatre fire in Canton, China. 1,670 killed.
- 1856 – Second Royal Opera House fire in London, England.
- 1863 – Church of the Company Fire in Santiago, Chile; killed over 2,500.
- 1864 – Boijmans Museum, Rotterdam, Netherlands, destroyed 198 Dutch Old Master paintings.
- 1870 – Château de Saint-Cloud destroyed by fire, 13 October 1870.
- 1870 – Wickford Bank Fire, Rhode Island, destroyed 160 years of town records kept in bank vault (records for what are multiple towns today such as Narragansett, North Kingstown, etc.).
- 1873 – Gyeongbokgung major fire.
- 1874 – Olympic Theatre destroyed by fire, killing two firefighters. Suspected arson.
- 1875 – Precious Blood Church fire in Holyoke, Massachusetts, burned and killed 78.
- 1876 – Brooklyn Theater fire, Brooklyn, New York, killed 273–300.
- 1876 – Gyeongbokgung major fire that destroyed much of the palace.
- 1877 – Second U.S. Patent Office fire, in Washington, D.C.
- 1881 – Fire of the National Theatre, Prague, Czech Republic (Austria-Hungary), brand-new building partially burned down during finishing of constructional works, no victims.
- 1881 – Ringtheater fire, Vienna, Austria (Austria-Hungary), killed at least 384.
- 1883 – Newhall House Hotel Fire, Milwaukee, Wisconsin, 10 January, killed at least 70.
- 1884 – Christiansborg Palace, Copenhagen.
- 1887 – Paris Opéra Fire on 25 May, killed 200.
- 1887 – Exeter Theatre Royal fire, Exeter, England on 5 September, killed 186.
- 1893 – World's Columbian Exposition cold storage warehouse fire in Chicago, Illinois on 10 July, killed 18.
- 1894 – Christmas Eve fire in Silver Lake, Oregon, on 24 December, killed 43 people including 19 women and children.
- 1895 – The Rotunda, University of Virginia, in Charlottesville, Virginia.
- 1897 – Fire at the Bazar de la Charité, Paris, France on 4 May, killed 126, mostly women.
- 1899 – Windsor Hotel fire East 47th Street/5th Avenue Manhattan, New York, killed 33–45.

== 20th century ==
=== 1900s ===
- 1900 – Hoboken Docks fire, Hoboken, New Jersey, on 30 June, killed 326.
- 1903 – Colney Hatch Lunatic Asylum fire, London, England on 27 January, killed 51.
- 1903 – Iroquois Theater fire, Chicago, Illinois, on 30 December, at least 600 killed.
- 1904 – January fire in the Turin National University Library, Turin, Italy, resulted in serious damage to the Manuscripts Department.
- 1904 – Sibley fire, in Rochester, New York, on 26 February.
- 1904 – Great Fire of Toronto, 19 April fire that destroyed a large section of Downtown Toronto, Canada.
- 1905 – Watson Street Lodging House fire in Glasgow, Scotland on 19 November, killed 39.
- 1908 – Rhoads Opera House fire, Boyertown, Pennsylvania, killed 170.
- 1908 – Parker Building, New York City, 10 January.
- 1908 – Collinwood school fire, in Collinwood, Ohio (soon absorbed by Cleveland), on 4 March, killed 175.
- 1909 – Flores Theater fire, Acapulco, Guerrero, Mexico, on 15 February, killed 250.

=== 1910s ===
==== 1910 ====
- 25 March – L. Fish Furniture Company fire in Chicago, Illinois, killed 12.
- 27 March – Fire of Szatmárököritó, Hungary. A fire in a barn during a dancing party killed 312.
- 21–22 December – Friedlander Leather Remnants factory fire, Philadelphia, Pennsylvania. 13 firefighters and 1 police officer killed in two separate collapses.
- 22 December – Nelson-Morris & Company stockyards fire in Chicago, Illinois, killed 21 firefighters.

==== 1911 ====
- 20 February – Bologoye cinema fire, Bologoye, Russian Empire, killed 64 and injured 191.
- 25 March – Triangle Shirtwaist Factory fire, New York City, killed 146.
- 10 April – Schaerbeek Municipal Hall in Brussels, Belgium, badly damaged by arsonists.

==== 1912 ====
- 9 January – Equitable Life Assurance Building, New York City.
- 29 November – University of Maryland, College Park, majority of campus buildings destroyed.

==== 1913 ====
- 28 February – Dewey Hotel fire in Omaha, Nebraska, killed 20.
- 22 July – Binghamton Factory fire, New York, killed 31.

==== 1914 ====
- 9 March – Missouri Athletic Club fire in St. Louis, Missouri, killed 30.

==== 1915 ====
- 28 October – St. John's School fire, Peabody, Massachusetts, killed 21.

==== 1916 ====
- 3 February – Centre Block of the Parliament Buildings in Ottawa, the capital of Canada.

==== 1917 ====
- 10 November – Major fire at Changdeokgung.

==== 1918 ====
- 26 February – Happy Valley Racecourse fire, Happy Valley, Hong Kong, over 600 killed.
- 13 April – Norman State Hospital fire in Norman, Oklahoma killed 40.

==== 1919 ====
- 19 June – Mayagüez Theater fire, San Juan, Puerto Rico, killed 150.

=== 1920s ===
==== 1921 ====
- 31 January – Palace-Colonial Hotel fire in Hoboken, New Jersey, killed 10.

==== 1922 ====
- 1922 – Public Records Office fire during civil unrest at the Four Courts complex, Dublin, Ireland, destroyed much of seven centuries of Irish public records.

==== 1923 ====
- 18 February – Manhattan State Hospital fire in New York City, killed 25.
- 17 May – Cleveland School fire, Camden, South Carolina, killed 77.
- 31 May – Petrograd Opera House fire in St. Petersburg, Russia, killed and injured "many" people (it is unknown exactly how many victims there were).

==== 1924 ====
- 24 December – Babbs Switch fire, Oklahoma, killed 36.

==== 1925 ====
- 18 March – Madame Tussauds wax museum in London, England.

==== 1926 ====
- 23 January – Lafayette Hotel fire in Allentown, Pennsylvania, killed 13.
- 14 July – Twilight Inn hotel fire in Tannersville, New York, killed 22.
- 5 September – Dromcolliher cinema fire in County Limerick, Ireland, killed 48.

==== 1927 ====
- 9 January – Laurier Palace Theatre Fire, Montreal, Canada, killed 77 children.

==== 1928 ====
- 22 September – Teatro de Novedades theater fire killed 68–110, in Madrid, Spain.
- 8 October – Penitentiary fire in Junction City, Ohio, killed 17.

==== 1929 ====
- 15 May – Cleveland Clinic fire, Cleveland, Ohio, killed 125.
- 11 July – Gillingham Fair fire disaster, Kent, England, killed 15 when firefighting demonstration went wrong.
- 20 September – Study Club nightclub fire, Detroit, Michigan, killed 22.
- 31 December – Glen Cinema disaster, Paisley, Scotland, killed 71.

=== 1930s ===
==== 1930 ====
- 10 March – Jinhae Primary School fire, Jinhae, Gyeongsangnamdo, South Korea, killed 104.
- 18 April – 1930 Costești wooden church fire in Argeș County, Romania, killed 118.
- 21 April – Ohio Penitentiary fire, Columbus, Ohio, killed 322.

==== 1931 ====
- 7 March – Prison camp fire in Kenansville, North Carolina, killed 11 inmates.
- 6 July – Glaspalast, Munich, fire.
- 25 July – Fire at the Little Sisters of the Poor's Home for the Aged in Pittsburgh, Pennsylvania, killed 42 and injured more than 200.

==== 1932 ====
- 26 December – Shirokiya Department Store fire in Tokyo, Japan, 14 killed.

==== 1933 ====
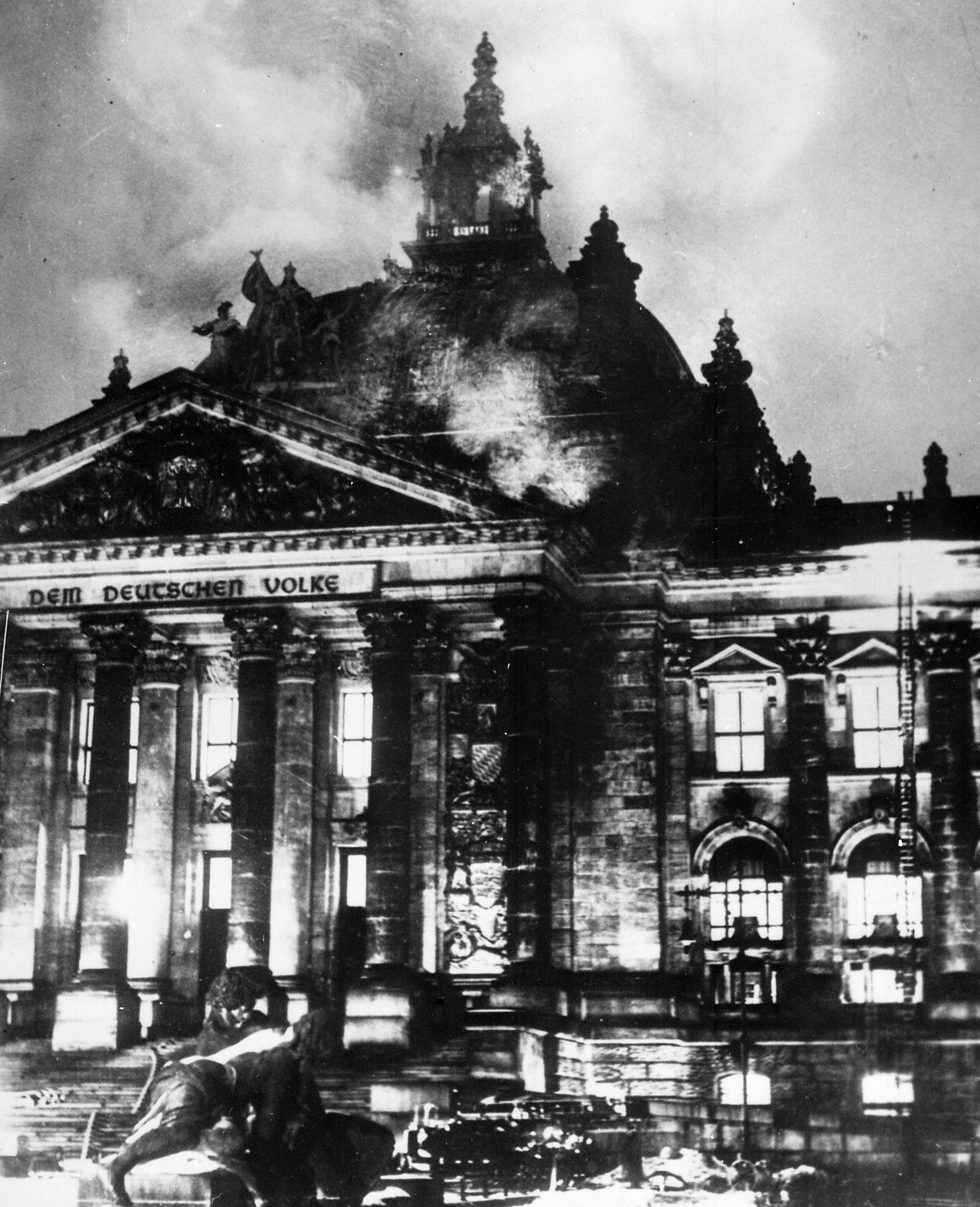
Firefighters struggle to extinguish the Reichstag fire on 27 February 1933.

- 27 February – Reichstag fire in Berlin, Germany, caused by arson, used to justify expansion of Nazi rule.

==== 1934 ====
- 21 March – The Great Hakodate Fire killed at least 2,166 people in southern Hokkaido, Japan.
- 24 March – Federal Transient Bureau building fire in Lynchburg, Virginia, killed 22.
- 10 November – 1934 Wimpole Street fire in Wimpole Street, London, England; killed five women.
- 11 December – Kerns Hotel fire in Lansing, Michigan, killed 34, including 7 Michigan legislators.

==== 1935 ====
- 22 August – Berlin Fair Fire in Berlin, Germany, also damaged the Berlin Radio Tower.

==== 1936 ====
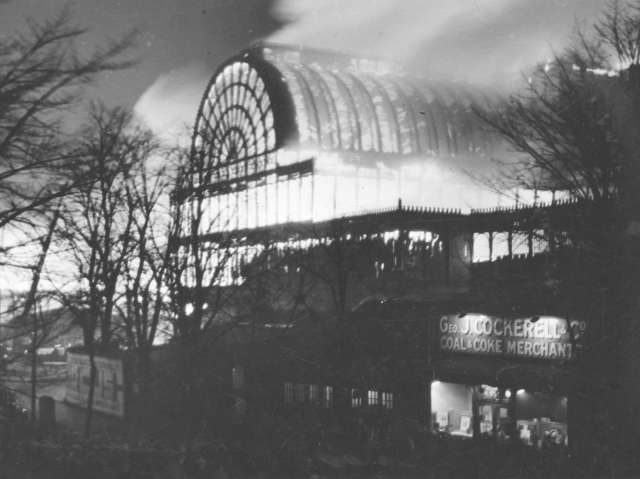
The Crystal Palace on fire on 30 November 1936.

- 30 November – The Crystal Palace housed the 1851 Great Exhibition in London, England; destroyed.

==== 1937 ====
- 13 February – Antoung Movie Theater fire, China, killed 658.
- 20 April – Kilingi-Nõmme school fire in Estonia, killed 18 schoolchildren and injured 50 more.
- 19–20 May – Akwawit alcohol plant fire in Poznań, Poland, nine injured.
- 9 July – 1937 Fox vault fire, Little Ferry, New Jersey, burned and destroyed almost all of the studio's pre-1932 silent films.
- 7 September – Witley Court in Worcestershire, England, burned down.
- 17 September – Rotunde, a landmark of the 1873 Vienna World's Fair, Austria, burned down.
- 20 December – South Tomita Primary School fire, Shirahama, in Wakayama, Japan, killed 81.

==== 1938 ====
- 18 January – College of the Sacred Heart fire in St. Hyacinthe, Quebec, killed 46.
- 16 May – Terminal Hotel Fire in Atlanta, Georgia, killed 35.
- 28 October – Nouvelles Galeries department store fire, Marseille, France, killed 73.

==== 1939 ====
- 2 March – Queen Hotel fire in Halifax, Nova Scotia, killed 28.

=== 1940s ===
==== 1940 ====
- 4 January – Marlborough Hotel fire in Minneapolis, Minnesota, killed 20.
- 23 April – Rhythm Club fire, Natchez, Mississippi, killed 209.
- 6 May – Town hall in Sandona, Nariño, Colombia, killed 118.
- 8 October – Mission school dormitory fire in Little, Kentucky, killed 10, including 9 female students.

==== 1941 ====
- 31 October – Booth's clothing factory fire in Huddersfield, England, killed 49.
- 12 December – Knights of Columbus Hostel fire in St. John's, Newfoundland and Labrador, killed 99.

==== 1942 ====
- 28 November – Cocoanut Grove fire in Boston, Massachusetts, killed 492.
- 8 December – Seacliff Lunatic Asylum fire, Seacliff, New Zealand, killed 37 female patients.

==== 1943 ====
- 1 February – Lake Forest Park Sanitarium fire in Seattle, Washington, killed 32.
- 23 February – Cavan Orphanage fire, Ireland, killed 36.
- 6 March – Hoteiza Theater Fire in Kucchan, Hokkaidō, Japan, killed 205.
- 10 May – Biblioteca Nacional in Lima, Peru. In May, a fire completely destroyed the National Library, with the loss of 100,000 volumes as well as 40,000 manuscripts.
- 7 September – Gulf Hotel fire in Houston, Texas, killed 55.

==== 1944 ====
- 12 May – Union Hotel fire in Oroville, California, killed 15.
- 6 July – Hartford Circus fire in Hartford, Connecticut, killed 168.

==== 1945 ====
- 16 January – General Clark Hotel fire in Chicago, Illinois, killed 14.
- 31 January – Boarding home/nursery fire in Auburn, Maine, killed 17, including 16 babies.
- 12 April – The St. Stephen's Cathedral in Vienna, Austria, suffered a devastating fire.
- May – Old Town Hall in Prague, Czechoslovakia. During the Prague uprising, a fire severely damaged the Old Town Hall, with the loss of its bell, the oldest in Bohemia, and 70,000 volumes, as well as historically priceless manuscripts.
- 28 July – B-25 Empire State Building crash. The Empire State Building in New York City was set on fire by a B-25 Mitchell bomber that crashed into the building, killing 14.
- 24 December – Niles Street Convalescent Hospital fire in Hartford, Connecticut, killed 21.

==== 1946 ====
- 3 January – NKGB club fire in Minsk, USSR, killed at least 27 (according to unofficial data more than 100 people).
- 28 January – Tinker Air Force Base in Oklahoma City, Oklahoma, hangar fire, killed 10.
- 5 June – LaSalle Hotel Fire in Chicago, Illinois, killed 61.
- 19 June – Hotel Canfield fire in Dubuque, Iowa, killed 19.
- 7 October - Apeldoorn, Netherlands. A Fairey Firefly crashed into the Christian Higher Secondary School, causing a fire that killed 22 students and the pilot, whose mother died of a heart attack in turn.
- 7 December – Winecoff Hotel fire in Atlanta, Georgia, killed 119 and injured 90.

==== 1947 ====
- 8 February – Karlslust dance hall fire in Berlin, Germany, killed 80–88.
- 30 August – Le Select Cinema fire in Rueil-Malmaison, France, killed 87.
- 18 November – Ballantyne's department store fire, Christchurch, New Zealand, killed 41.

==== 1948 ====
- 10 February – Fire at Hull boarding home in St. John's, Newfoundland, killed 33 people.
- 10 March – Fire at Highland Hospital in Asheville, North Carolina, killed nine, including Zelda Fitzgerald.
- 22 September – Wing On warehouse fire, Hong Kong, 176 killed and 69 injured.

==== 1949 ====
- 5 April – St. Anthony's Hospital fire in Effingham, Illinois, killed 76.

=== 1950s ===
==== 1950 ====
- 7 January – Mercy Hospital fire, Davenport, Iowa, killed 41.
- 18 March – Sandia Base stockade fire in Albuquerque, New Mexico, killed 14.
- 2 July – Kinkaku-ji fire by arsonist in Kyoto, Japan.
- 22 December – Convalescent home fire in Amarillo, Texas, killed 10.

==== 1951 ====
- 30 January – Convalescent home fire in Hoquiam, Washington, killed 21.
- 13 May – al-Duniya Theater fire in Kano, present day of Nigeria, killed 331.
- 19 May – Ohara Movie Theater fire in Hamanaka, Hokkaido, killed 40.

==== 1952 ====
- 23 September – Coleshill House in Berkshire, England, destroyed.
- 31 October – Cedar Grove nursing home fire in Hillsboro, Missouri, killed 20.

==== 1953 ====
- 29 March – Littlefield Nursing Home fire in Largo, Florida, killed 34.
- 17 April – Haber Screw Company building fire in Chicago, Illinois, killed 36.

==== 1954 ====
- 31 March – 1954 Cleveland Hill School District fire in Cheektowaga, New York, killed 15.

==== 1955 ====
- 12 February – Barton Hotel fire in Chicago, Illinois, killed 29.
- 16 February – Elderly home for Catholic church fire in Yokohama, Japan, killed 100.
- 28 April – Green Mill Hotel fire in Chicago, Illinois, killed 12.
- 11 May – Cinema fire in Wielopole Skrzyńskie, Poland, killed 58 and injured 20.
- 13 December – Kindergarten fire in Vyazma (Smolensk Oblast, Soviet Union), killed 19.

==== 1956 ====
- 29 January – Arundel Park Auditorium fire in Anne Arundel County, Maryland, killed 10.
- 19 March – Krasny Yar Club fire, Krasny Yar, USSR, killed 36 (mostly children) and injured 25.
- 29 July – McKee refinery fire killed 19 firefighters.
- 31 July – Reagan Nursing Home fire in Puxico, Missouri, killed 12.

==== 1957 ====
- 13 February – Nursing home fire in Council Bluffs, Iowa, killed 16.
- 17 February – Warrenton Nursing Home fire in Warrenton, Missouri, killed 72.
- 12 November – Cinema fire near Brest, Belorussian SSR, killed 65.
- 16 November – Moonglow Hotel fire in Niagara Falls, New York, killed 18.

==== 1958 ====
- 19 March – Monarch Underwear Company fire in New York City, killed 24.
- 1 December – Our Lady of the Angels School fire, Chicago, Illinois, killed 95.
- 16 December – Almacen Vida Department Store Fire, killed 83 and injured 200 in Bogotá, Colombia.

==== 1959 ====
- 5 March – Arkansas Negro Boys' Industrial School fire in Wrightsville, Arkansas, killed 21.
- 23 June – Stalheim Hotel fire, Norway, killed 34.

=== 1960s ===
==== 1960 ====
- 2 March – Kukje Rubber Manufacturing plant 2 fire at Busan, South Korea, killed 68, injured 44.
- 28 March – Cheapside Street whisky bond fire, Glasgow, Scotland, killed 14 firefighters and 5 salvage corpsmen.
- 14 July – Guatemala Mental Hospital Fire, killed 225.
- 13 November – Amuda cinema fire in Amuda, Syria, killed 152 schoolchildren.

==== 1961 ====
- 6 January – Thomas Hotel fire in San Francisco, California, killed 20.
- 1 May – The Penthouse Club, formerly the Top Storey nightclub fire in Bolton, England, killed 19.
- 5 November – 1961 Elbarusovo school fire (Elbarusovo), Soviet Union, killed 110 including 106 children.
- 8 December – Hartford Hospital fire in Hartford, Connecticut, killed 16.
- 13 December – MS Maria Konopnicka fire in the Gdańsk Shipyard, killed 22.
- 17 December – Niterói circus fire in Niterói (Brazil), killed 503.

==== 1962 ====
- 2 August – Chau Street tenement house fire, in New Kowloon, Hong Kong, killed 44 and injured 21.
- 26 October – St Andrew's Hall in Glasgow, Scotland, the home of the Scottish National Orchestra, was destroyed by fire.
- 9 November – The Ford Rotunda in Dearborn, Michigan, was destroyed by fire during preparations for a Christmas display.

==== 1963 ====
- 4 May – Le Monde Theater fire at Diourbel, Kaolack, Senegal, killed 64.
- 31 October – Fairgrounds Coliseum explosion in Indianapolis, Indiana, killed 74.
- 18 November – Surfside Hotel Fire in Atlantic City, New Jersey, killed 25.
- 23 November – Golden Age Nursing Home fire in Fitchville, Ohio, killed 63.
- 29 December – Hotel Roosevelt fire in Jacksonville, Florida, killed 22.

==== 1964 ====
- 23 May – All Hallows Church parish hall fire in San Francisco, California, killed 17.
- 18 December – McGraw Nursing Home fire in Fountaintown, Indiana, killed 20.

==== 1965 ====
- 11 December – Seeley Club fire in Chicago, Illinois, killed 13. Robert Lee Lassiter was found guilty of murder for setting the fire.
- 21 December – Yonkers Jewish Community Center fire in Yonkers, New York, killed 12.

==== 1966 ====
- 28 January – Paramount Hotel fire in Boston, Massachusetts, killed 11.
- 22 April – Lapinlahti Municipal Home fire in Lapinlahti, Finland, killed 29.
- 13 August – William Booth Memorial Home fire in Australia, killed 30.

==== 1967 ====
- 7 February – Dale's Penthouse restaurant fire in Montgomery, Alabama, killed 25.
- 6 March – Mélan orphanage in Taninges, France, killed 18.
- 22 May – L'Innovation Department Store fire in Brussels, Belgium, killed 251 and injured 62.
- 13 July – Florida State Prison Fire, in Jay, Florida, killed 37.
- 24 December – Store fire "Regalux" in Formosa, Argentina, killed 20 and injured 70.

==== 1968 ====
- 7 February – Mickelberry Sausage Company plant explosion and building fire in Chicago, Illinois, killed nine.
- 26 February – Shelton Hospital fire, Shrewsbury, killed 21 and injured 14.
- 25 May – Explosion and fire at the Labor reserves stadium, Kirov, USSR, killed 35 and injured 88.
- 2 November – Ikenobo Mangetsujyo Hotel fire at Arima Spa, Kobe, Japan, killed 30 and injured 44.
- 18 November – James Watt Street fire in Glasgow, Scotland, killed 24.

==== 1969 ====
- 5 February – Bandai Atami International Sightseeing Hotel fire, in Koriyama, Japan, killed 31.
- 2 December – A nursing home fire in Notre-Dame-du-Lac, Quebec, killed 54.
- 27 December – Rose and Crown Hotel fire in Saffron Walden, England, killed 11.

=== 1970s ===
==== 1970 ====
- 9 January – Nursing home fire in Marietta, Ohio, killed 31.
- 20 March – Ozark Hotel arson fire in Seattle, Washington, killed 21.
- 23 May – Britannia Bridge fire in the Menai Strait in Wales; no casualties, but destroyed the link between island of Anglesey and the Wales mainland.
- 31 August – Fenglei ship fire in Shanghai, China, killed 15 and severely injured 60.
- 13 September – Ponet Square Hotel and Apartments fire, in Los Angeles, killed 19 people.
- 1 November – Club Cinq-Sept fire in Saint-Laurent-du-Pont, France, killed 146.
- 20 December – Pioneer Hotel fire, Tucson, Arizona, killed 29.
- 22 December – York Hotel Fire in Redcar, England, killed four.

==== 1971 ====
- 14 January – Westminster Terrace Presbyterian Home for Senior Citizens fire in Louisville, Kentucky, killed 10.
- 26–27 June – Czechowice-Dziedzice Refinery fire, Czechowice-Dziedzice, Poland, killed 37 and injured 105.
- 28 September – Hotel 't Silveren Seepaerd fire, Eindhoven, Netherlands, killed 11 and severely injured 16.
- 19 October – Geiger Nursing Home fire in Honesdale, Pennsylvania, killed 15.
- 30 October – Under construction Jumbo Kingdom fire in Aberdeen Harbour, Hong Kong, killed up to 34 workers.
- 25 December – Daeyeonggak Hotel fire in Seoul, South Korea, killed 158 people.

==== 1972 ====
- 26 January – Green Nursing Home fire in Lincoln Heights, Ohio, killed 10.
- 24 February – Andraus Building Fire killed 16 in São Paulo.
- 4 April – Fair Hills boarding home fire in Rosecrans, Wisconsin, killed 10.
- 5 May – Carver Convalescent Center fire in Springfield, Illinois, killed 10.
- 13 May – Sennichi Department Store Building fire in Osaka, Japan, killed 118.
- 17 June – Hotel Vendome fire in Boston, Massachusetts, killed nine firefighters.
- 5 July – Coldharbour Hospital fire in Sherborne, England, killed 30.
- 18 August – Nursing Home in Ris-Orangis, France, killed 12.
- 2 September – Blue Bird Café fire in Montreal, Canada, firebombed, killed 37.
- 24 September – A fire at the Oscar Club restaurant in Rhodes, Greece, killed 31 and injured a further 16, mostly Scandinavian tourists.
- 21 November – 1972 Robinsons department store fire in Singapore, killed 12 and destroyed the 114-year-old landmark building.
- 2 December – Seoul Citizen Hall (present day of Sejong Center) in Jongno-gu, Seoul, killed 51 and injured 76.

==== 1973 ====
- 29 January – Street's Rest Home fire in Pleasantville, New Jersey, killed 10. Resident Harry Kemp was arrested for setting the fire.
- 6 February – Edouard-Pailleron school in Paris, France (arson), killed 21.
- 18 March – Whiskey Au Go Go nightclub in Brisbane, Queensland, was firebombed, killed 15.
- 24 June – UpStairs Lounge arson attack at a gay bar in New Orleans, Louisiana, killed 32.
- 12–16 July – National Archives Fire in St. Louis, Missouri.
- 24 July – Fire at the Esplanade hotel in Oban, Scotland killed 10 tourists. The fire was thought to be caused by a discarded cigarette.
- 2 August – Summerland disaster in Douglas, Isle of Man, killed 50.
- 1 September – Hotel Hafnia fire, Copenhagen, Denmark, killed 35.
- 15 November – Stratford Apartment fire, Los Angeles, killed 25 and injured 52.
- 29 November – 1973 Taiyo Department Store fire in Kumamoto, Japan, killed 104.
- 4 December – Caley Nursing Home and Rehabilitation Center fire in Wayne, Pennsylvania, killed 15.

==== 1974 ====
- 23 January – Sacred Heart School fire in Heusden, Belgium, killed 23.
- 1 February – Joelma Fire killed 188 in São Paulo.
- 30 June – Gulliver's nightclub fire killed 24 in Port Chester, New York, as a result of arson at an adjacent business to cover up a minor burglary.
- 3 November – Daewan Corner complex building fire, Dongdaemun-gu, Seoul, South Korea, killed 88 and injured 35.
- 12 December – Worsley Hotel fire, Maida Vale, London, case of arson, resulting in attendance of over 25 appliances and killed seven.

==== 1975 ====
- 22 January – A factory fire in Marikina, Philippines, killed 42 and injured 79.
- 13 February – World Trade Center fire. Act of arson, indirectly killed one.
- 28 March – Hotel fire in Santa Maria Maggiore, Piedmont, Italy killed 14 and injured 40.
- 9 June – Seminole County jail fire in Sanford, Florida, killed 11.
- 7 July – Pomona Hotel fire in Portland, Oregon. Act of arson, killed 12.
- 17 August – Philadelphia Refinery Fire, Philadelphia, Pennsylvania, killed eight firefighters.
- 17 August – Savoy Hotel fire, in Sydney, Australia, killed 15 and injured 25.

==== 1976 ====
- 1 January – Dance bar 6-9 fire in La Louvière, Belgium, killed 15 and injured 40.
- 10 January – Hotel Pathfinder explosion and fire in Fremont, Nebraska, killed 20 and injured 40.
- 30 January – Wincrest Nursing Home fire in Chicago, Illinois, killed 23.
- 24 October – Puerto Rican Social Club fire in New York City, killed 25 and injured 24.
- 26 December – A retirement home fire in Goulds, Newfoundland and Labrador, killed 22.

==== 1977 ====
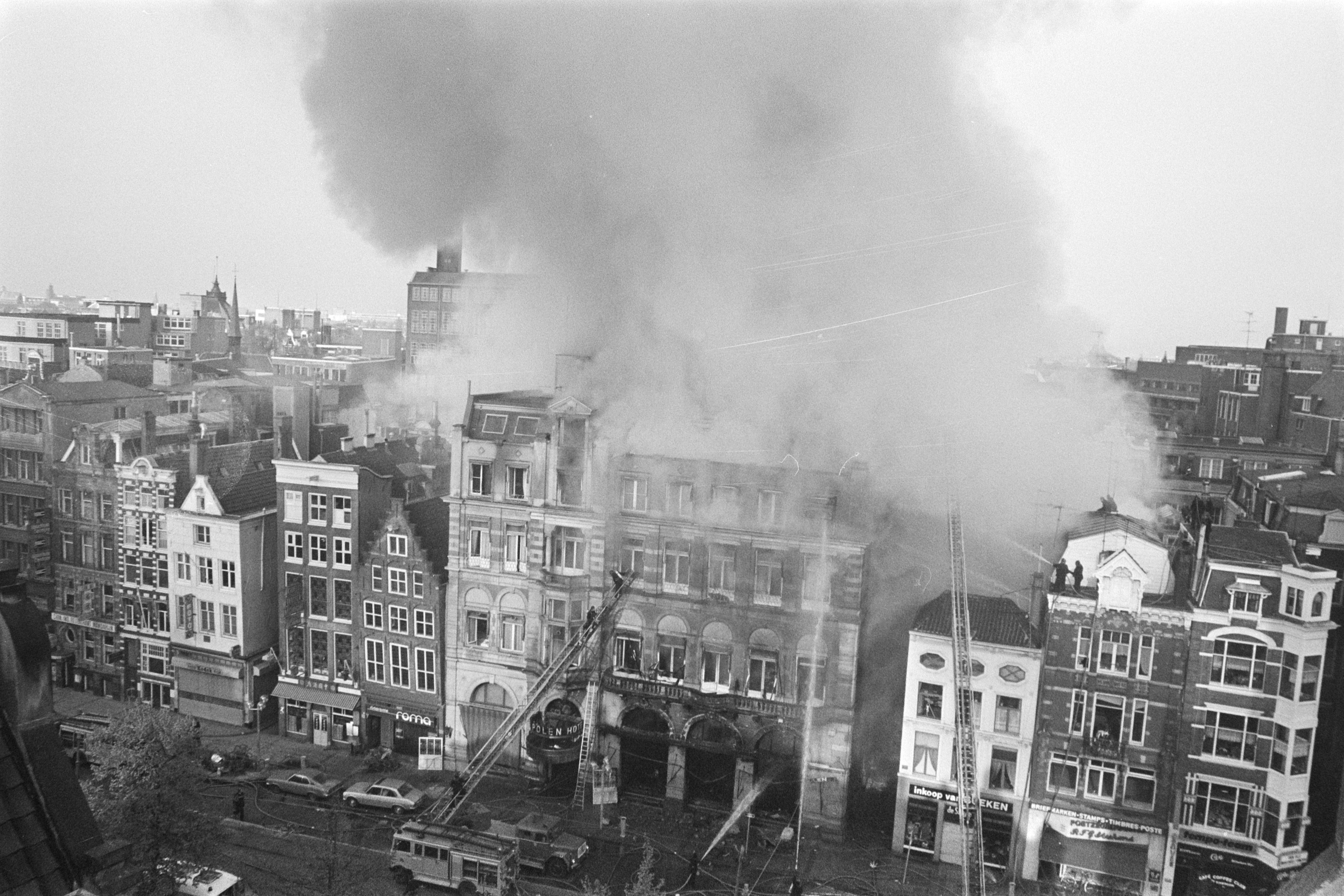
The Hotel Polen on fire on 9 May 1977.

- 18 February – 61st Regiment Farm fire in Xinjiang, China, killed 694. The fire started when a pile of undisposed wreaths for the late Mao Zedong were set off by a child celebrating the Chinese New Year.
- 25 February – Rossiya Hotel fire in Moscow, Russia, 42–45 killed and 50 injured.
- 27 February – Moscow–Leningrad (USSR) train fire killed 17.
- 9 May – Hotel Polen fire in Amsterdam, Netherlands, killed 33.
- 28 May – Beverly Hills Supper Club fire killed 165 and injured more than 200 in Southgate, Kentucky; third deadliest nightclub fire in U.S. history.
- 21 June – Saint John City Hall fire in Saint John, Canada, killed 21.
- 26 June – 42 people were killed in a prison fire in Columbia, Tennessee.
- 7 July – 5 people were killed and 71 others were injured after a fire at the Federal Correctional Institution, Danbury, Connecticut.
- 10 December – A fire at the Wenonah Hotel in Bay City, Michigan, killed 10.
- 13 December – A fire in the Aquinas Hall dormitory at Providence College in Rhode Island, killed 10 students.

==== 1978 ====
- 19 August – Cinema Rex fire, Abadan, Khuzestan, Iran; arson, killed 377–470.
- 14 March – A prison fire in Buenos Aires, Argentina, killed 61 and injured 85.
- 11 June – A fire spread at the head office of the daily newspaper Le Mauricien in Port Louis, Mauritius, and became the focus of the Affaire Sheik Hossen political scandal and enquiry.
- 2 August – Waldbaum's supermarket fire, Brooklyn, New York. 6 New York City firefighters died when the roof collapsed, plunging 12 firefighters into the flames.
- 5 November – A fire at the Younkers Department store at the Merle Hay Mall in Des Moines, Iowa, killed 10 store employees. The store was closed and rebuilt a year after the fire.
- 5 November – A fire at the Allen Motor Inn in Honesdale, Pennsylvania killed 12.
- 26 November – Holiday Inn fire in Greece, New York. Act of arson, killed 10.

==== 1979 ====
- 23 January – Old People's Nurse Home fire at Virrat, Pirkanmaa, Finland, killed at least 26.
- 3 March – Great Fire of Bedford School, Bedford School, Bedford, England. Act of arson.
- 2 April – Nursing home fire in Farmington, Missouri, killed 26.
- 8 May – Woolworth store fire in Manchester, England, killed 10.
- 9 June – Luna Park Ghost Train fire, at Luna Park Sydney, in Australia, killed 7.
- 12 July – Hotel Corona de Aragón fire in Zaragoza, Aragon, Spain, killed at least 80.
- 29 July – Lakshimki Talkies cinema fire, in Tuticorin, Tamil Nadu, India, killed 78 and injured 88.
- 31 July – Fire at the Holiday Inn in Cambridge, Ohio killed 10 and injured 78.
- 28 September – Hotel Am Augarten fire in Vienna, Austria, killed 25.
- 11 November – Pioneer, Ohio nursing home fire, killed 14.
- 5 December – Bar fire in Rosario, Argentina, killed 16 and injured 11.

=== 1980s ===
==== 1980 ====
- 1 January – Opémiska Community Hall fire, Chapais, Quebec, Canada, killed 48.
- 20 May – Eventide Home for the Aged in Kingston, Jamaica, killed 157.
- 31 May – 1980 Saskatoon Queen's Hotel fire, Saskatoon, Canada, killed two firefighters.
- 14 July – Third floor of the Extendicare Ltd. nursing home in Mississauga, Ontario, killed 21 residents.
- 26 July – Boarding home fire in Bradley Beach, New Jersey, killed 24.
- 16 August – Denmark Place fire by arson killed 37 in Soho, London.
- 31 October–1 November – 1980 Górna Grupa psychiatric hospital fire, in Górna Grupa, Poland, during the night killed 55 patients and injured 26.
- 21 November – MGM Grand Hotel and Casino fire in Las Vegas, Nevada, killed 87.
- 22 November – Kawaji Prince Hotel Fire in Kinugawa, Japan, killed 45.
- 4 December – Stouffer's Inn of Westchester in Harrison, New York, killed 26.

==== 1981 ====
- 9 January – Boarding home fire in Keansburg, New Jersey, killed 31.
- 18 January – New Cross Fire, London, England, killed 13.
- 8 February – Bangalore circus fire in Bangalore, India, killed 92.
- 14 February – Stardust Disaster, discotheque fire in Dublin, Ireland, killed 48.
- 14 February – Edifício Grande Avenida Fire in São Paulo, Brazil, killed 17.
- 21 March – The Santa María Tower fire in Santiago de Chile, killed 11.
- 7 December – Nilkanth Mahadev temple fire in Asarwa, Gujarat, India, killed 49.

==== 1982 ====
- 8 February – Hotel New Japan fire in downtown Tokyo, Japan, killed 33 and injured 27.
- 6 March – Westchase Hilton hotel fire in Houston, Texas, killed 12 and injured 3.
- 25 April – A fire resulting from an explosion at an antiques exhibition in Todi, Italy killed 34.
- 11 May – The Notre Dame de Lourdes Church fire in Fall River, Massachusetts, destroyed the historic church and much of two adjacent city blocks.
- 8 November – In Biloxi, Mississippi, a mentally ill inmate started a fire by igniting the polyurethane foam on the walls using a cigarette, killing 29 inmates and injuring at least 43 people."Death toll rises to 29 in jail fire". Chicago Tribune. November 15, 1982. p. 1-11.
- 25–26 November – Minneapolis Thanksgiving Day Fire destroyed the Norwest Corporation headquarters building and former Donaldson's flagship store.
- 23 December – Dorothy Mae Apartment-Hotel fire arson fire in Los Angeles, California, killed 25 people, the highest death toll from a structure fire in the city's history.

==== 1983 ====
- 13 February – Cinema Statuto fire in Turin, Italy, killed 64 and injured 20.
- 16 December – Fire at Club Casa Rosso in Amsterdam, Netherlands, killed 13.
- 17 December – Alcalá 20 nightclub fire in Madrid, Spain, killed 78.

==== 1984 ====
- 11 May – Haunted Castle attraction at Six Flags Great Adventure amusement park in Jackson Township, New Jersey. Eight teenagers died in a fast-moving fire. Their corpses were mistaken for mannequins by emergency personnel. None of them or the Six Flags administrators realized these fatalities until later.
- 9 July – York Minster fire. A fire destroyed part of the Minster's roof in York, England.
- 23 July – Union Oil refinery in Romeoville, Illinois, had two explosions and a fire, killing at least 14 and injuring 23.
- 23 October – A fire at The Pines Hotel in Baguio, Philippines killed 17 and injured 51, most being members of an American Legion tour group visiting for the 40th anniversary of General Douglas MacArthur's return to the Philippines.

==== 1985 ====
- 26 April – Saavedra Psychiatric Hospital fire in Buenos Aires, Argentina, killed 79 and injured 247.
- 11 May – Valley Parade Ground Stadium fire in Bradford, England, killed 56.
- 20 September – The Tholsel, the town hall of Kilkenny, Ireland, gutted by fire.

==== 1986 ====
- 11 February – Daitokan Hotel Fire in Higashiizu, Shizuoka Prefecture, Japan, killed 24.
- 17 February – Andorinha Building fire was caused by a short circuit in the building, killing 21 in Rio de Janeiro, Brazil.
- 31 March – Hampton Court Palace fire near London, England, was determined to have been accidentally set by its only victim, the 86-year-old widow of General Richard Gale.
- 26 April – Chernobyl disaster: An explosion and fire in the No. 4 reactor in the Chernobyl Nuclear Power Plant led to a meltdown resulting in the worst nuclear accident to date.
- 5 September – Hotel Caledonien fire: A fire at the Hotel Caledonien in Kristiansand, Norway killed 14 and injured 60.
- 8 October – The Cipel-Marco fur factory in Kwai Chung, Hong Kong, exploded, causing a fire and killing 14.
- 1 November – Fire and chemical spill at Sandoz in the Schweizerhalle industrial area near Basel, Switzerland, caused heavy pollution in the river Rhine.
- 31 December – Dupont Plaza Hotel fire, set by disgruntled employees, killed 97 in San Juan, Puerto Rico.

==== 1987 ====
- 18 November – King's Cross tube station fire in London, England, killed 31 and injured 100.

==== 1988 ====
- 4 May – First Interstate Tower fire in Los Angeles, California, killed one.

==== 1989 ====
- 8 February – Premier Studio of Mysore fire, Mysore, Karnataka, India, killed 62.
- 8 March – Fire set by an arsonist in the former "Hôtel de l'Europe" transformed into accommodation in Belfort, France, killed 15.
- 17 September – Downunder Hostel fire set by an arsonist in a backpackers hostel in Sydney, Australia, killed six.
- 21 September – 1989 Taufiqiah Al-Khairiah madrasa fire. Girls' school fire in Kedah, Malaysia, killed 27 girls.
- 5 October – Hillhaven Rehabilitation and Convalescent Home fire in Norfolk, Virginia, killed 12.
- 24 December – Sevier Center renovated hotel senior residence in Johnson City, Tennessee, killed 14 by smoke inhalation.

=== 1990s ===
==== 1990 ====
- 14 January – Flying discothèque fire at Zaragoza, Aragon, Spain, killed 43.
- 25 March – Happy Land fire, arson fire in the Bronx, New York City, killed 87, the deadliest crime committed by a single person in the history of New York City.

==== 1991 ====
- 23 February – Leningrad hotel fire killed 16 including 9 firefighters and injured 36.
- 7 May – Bright Sparklers Fireworks fire, killed 26 and injured over 100.
- 27 June - 21 people killed in a fire at the Barbotan-les-Thermes spa in Cazaubon, France
- 3 September – Hamlet chicken processing plant fire killed 25.
- 17 December – Funhouse at Blackpool Pleasure Beach, England, destroyed.

==== 1992 ====
The Executive Council Building in flames during the Siege of Sarajevo in May 1992

- 3 February – Shek Kong Vietnamese refugee detention centre fire, Hong Kong, killed 24 and injured 126.
- May – Executive Council Building fire in Sarajevo, Bosnia and Herzegovina.
- 16 September – Pension de Vogel homeless hostel fire, The Hague, Netherlands, killed 11 and injured 15.
- 20 November – Windsor Castle fire, England.
- 26 November – A part of the roof and the upper floor of the Hofburg Imperial Palace in Vienna, Austria, burned down.

==== 1993 ====
- 18 January – Fire in a ten-storey building in the Hsinhua section of Taipei, Taiwan, killed 34.
- 14 February – Linxi department store fire in Tangshan, China, killed 79 and injured 51.
- 16 March – Paxton Hotel fire, Chicago, Illinois, killed 19 and injured 30.
- 19 April – During the Waco Siege, a Branch Davidian church, Mount Carmel Center, was destroyed by fire near Waco, Texas, killing 76.
- 10 May – Kader Toy Factory fire in Thailand killed 189.
- 26 June – A fire at a psychiatric clinic at the St. Francois d'Assise clinic near Rennes, France killed at least 17.
- 2 July – Madimak Hotel fire, in Turkey killed 37.
- 5 August – Qingshuihe warehouse fire in China killed 18.
- 19 November – Zhili toy factory fire, in China killed 87.
- 13 December – A textile factory fire in Fuzhou, China, killed 61.
- 20 December – Kheyvis nightclub fire in Argentina killed 17 and injured 24.

==== 1994 ====
- 3 January – 1994 Sabaneta fire in Maracaibo, Venezuela, killed 108.
- 10 January – HSBC Shek Kip Mei branch fire, Shek Kip Mei, Hong Kong, killed 12 in firebomb attack.
- 4–5 February – The Parlement of Rennes, set alight by fishermen on strike, destroyed.
- 26 February – Clerkenwell cinema fire in London, United Kingdom, killed 11.
- 27 November – Fuxin Discothèque fire at Fuxin, Liaoning, China, killed 234.
- 10 December – 1994 Karamay fire, Karamay, Xinjiang, China, killed 324 (288 pupils and 36 teachers).
- 31 December – Switel Hotel fire, Antwerp, Belgium, killed 15 and severely injured 164.

==== 1995 ====
- 15 February – Weierkang Club fire, Taichung, Taiwan, killed 64.
- 14 March – Anshan hotel fire, Anshan, Liaoning, China, killed 30.
- 24 April – Ürümqi fire, Urumqi, Xinjiang, China, killed 51.
- 18 August – Gyeonggi Women Technical School fire, Yongin, Gyeonggi, South Korea, killed 38.
- 26 August – Hotel St. George fire, Brooklyn, New York.
- 12 December – Saaremaa Joint Gymnasium fire, Kuressaare, Estonia, killed two.
- 23 December – Dabwali fire accident, Haryana, India, killed 445.

==== 1996 ====
- 29 January – Teatro La Fenice in Venice, Italy.
- 18 March – Ozone Disco fire, Quezon City, Philippines, killed 162 and injured 95.
- 28 March – Kebon Kembang shopping mall fire, Bogor, Jawa Barat, Indonesia, killed 78.
- 11 April – Düsseldorf Airport fire, killed 17.
- 7 November – Heaven Hill distillery fire in Kentucky.
- 20 November – The Garley Building fire, Hong Kong, killed 40.
- 27 November – Residential building fire caused by arson attack, Shanghai, China, killed 36.

==== 1997 ====
- 25 January – Top One Karaoke fire caused by arson attack, Tsim Sha Tsui, Hong Kong, killed 17.
- 1 February – 1997 Aisin fire, Kariya, Aichi, Japan.
- 8 June – Brihadiswara temple fire started by a visitor's firecracker, at Thanjavur, Tamil Nadu, India, killed 60 and injured 200.
- 13 June – Uphaar Cinema fire, Green Park, New Delhi, India, killed 59.
- 11 July – Royal Jomtien Resort Hotel fire, in Thailand, killed 90.
- 21 September – Arson attack by an employee at a shoe factory, Jinjiang City, Fujian, China, killed 32.

==== 1998 ====
- 25 March – Dormitory fire at Bombolulu Girls High School, Mombasa, Kenya, killed 24.
- 16 May – Fire at the Lung Center of the Philippines in Quezon City, killed 25.
- 29 October – Gothenburg discotheque fire, discotheque fire in Gothenburg, Sweden, killed 63.
- 3 December – Orphanage fire in Manila, Philippines, killed 28.

==== 1999 ====
- 10 February – Samara Police Department fire killed 57 people and injured over 200.
- 15 February – Lake Worth Church fire in Lake Worth, Texas, killed three firefighters. Suspected arson.
- 13 March – Blue Market massacre in Istanbul, Turkey, killed 13.
- 23 May – 1999 L'Amicale riots in Port Louis, Mauritius killed seven individuals linked to gambling house L'Amicale, following an arson attack associated with football hooliganism after a soccer match confronting Fire Brigade versus Scouts Club.
- 11 June – Garnock Court fire in Irvine, Scotland, killed one and injured five.
- 30 June – Sealand Youth Training Center Fire. The one-storey Sealand Youth Training Center fire at Hwaseong, South Korea, killed 23 and injured 5.
- 24 September – Two-storey buildings with cinema complex fire at Yogyakarta, Central Java, Indonesia, killed 75.
- 30 October – Four-storey complex buildings with Sun-Hun Choe karaoke room fire at Incheon, South Korea, killed 54 and injured 70.
- 3 December – Worcester Cold Storage and Warehouse Co. fire killed six firefighters.
- 26 December – Jilin hotel fire, Changchun, Jilin, China, killed 20.

== 21st century ==
=== 2000s ===
==== 2000 ====
- 29 March – Tiantang cinema fire in Jiaozuo, Henan, China, killed 74.
- 22 April – Qingzhou chicken processing plant fire, Qingzhou, Shandong, China, killed 38.
- 13 May – Enschede fireworks disaster in the Netherlands, killed 22.
- 23 June – Childers Palace Backpackers Hostel fire in Queensland, Australia, killed 15 in arson attack.
- 30 June – Fireworks factory fire, Guangdong, China, killed 36.
- 27 August – Fire in the Ostankino Tower in Moscow, Russia.
- 11 November – Kaprun disaster, 155 people killed in a fire in a funicular train.
- 25 December – Luoyang Christmas fire in Henan, China, killed 309.

==== 2001 ====
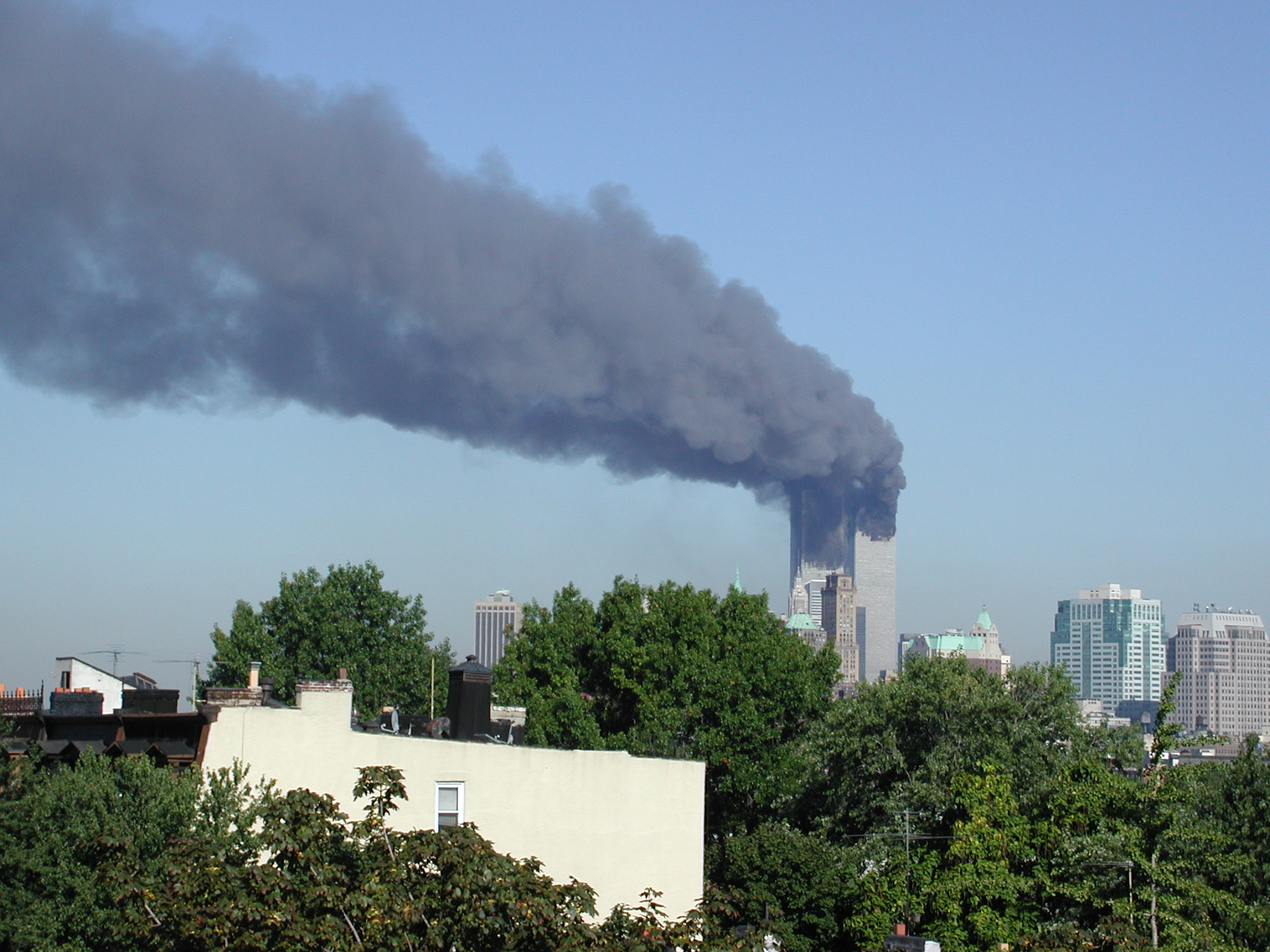
The World Trade Center, as seen from Brooklyn, burning during the September 11 attacks

- 1 January – Volendam New Years fire in the Netherlands, killed 14 and injured 241.
- 26 March – Kyanguli Secondary school fire in Machakos, Eastern Province, Kenya, killed 68.
- 1 May – A fire at Phantasialand in Germany destroyed two roller coasters, a theatre and parts of the Westernstadt. It caused about 38 million DM (US$17 million) in damage and injured 54.
- 6 August – Erwadi fire incident in Tamil Nadu, India, killed 28.
- 17 August – Manor Hotel fire in Quezon City, Philippines, killed 74.
- 1 September – Myojo 56 building fire in Tokyo, Japan, killed 44 by arson.
- 11 September – September 11 attacks: Two airliners were deliberately flown into the World Trade Center in New York City, causing significant structural damage while also lighting multiple floors of the Twin Towers on fire. Both towers lasted less than two hours after being struck. The attacks caused several surrounding buildings, including 7 World Trade Center, to also catch fire. 2,606 people died at the World Trade Center site. The Pentagon, in Arlington, Virginia, was hit by another airliner that day, suffering a fire and partial collapse that killed 125 in the building.
- 24 November – Canecão Mineiro nightclub fire in Belo Horizonte, Brazil, killed seven.
- 21 December – Cathedral of St. John the Divine in New York City caught fire.
- 24 December – Woodbine Building Supply fire in Toronto, Canada. Arsonists set fire to the building in an insurance fraud scheme; one of the arsonists died when the building exploded.
- 29 December – Mesa Redonda fire in Lima, killed 291.

==== 2002 ====
- 16 June – Lanjisu internet cafe fire in Beijing, China. Disgruntled youngsters set fire to the cafe after being banned. The fire killed 25 people and injured 13 others.
- 26 June – Shreejee International footwear factory fire in Agra, Uttar Pradesh, India, killed 42.
- 9 July – Heppi Karaoke bar fire in Palembang, South Sumatra, Indonesia, killed 42.
- 29 October – Ho Chi Minh City ITC fire in Vietnam, killed 60 and injured 90.
- 2 November – Sidi Moussa prison fire in El Jadida, Morocco, killed 50.
- 1 December – La Guajira nightclub fire in Caracas, Venezuela, killed 47.

==== 2003 ====
- 2–3 January – Château de Lunéville gutted by fire.
- 18 February – Daegu subway fire in South Korea, killed 192 by arson.
- 20 February – The Station nightclub fire in West Warwick, Rhode Island, killed 100 and injured 230.
- 26 February – Greenwood Nursing Home fire in Hartford, Connecticut, killed 16.
- 17 October – Cook County Administration Building fire, killed six; tied for largest litigated payout: $100 million.
- 25 September – Nursing home fire in Nashville, Tennessee, killed 16.
- 11 November – 2003 Hengyang fire in China, killed 20.
- 24 November – 2003 Peoples' Friendship University of Russia fire in Moscow, Russia, killed 44.

==== 2004 ====
- 23 January – Srirangam marriage hall fire in Srirangam, India, killed 64.
- 16 February – Zhongbai Commercial Plaza fire in Jilin, China, killed 53.
- 17 May – San Pedro Sula prison fire in Honduras, killed 103.
- 24 May – Momart warehouse fire in Leyton, East London, destroyed numerous significant contemporary works of art.
- 16 July – 2004 Kumbakonam School fire in Tamil-Nadu, India, killed 94.
- 1 August – Ycuá Bolaños supermarket fire in Asunción, Paraguay, killed 370 and injured 500.
- 5 August – The Bauges Riding school fire in Lescheraines, France, killed nine.
- 17 October – Parque Central Complex fire in Caracas, Venezuela.
- 30 December – República Cromagnon nightclub fire in Buenos Aires, Argentina killed 194 and injured 714.

==== 2005 ====
- 2 February – Harrow Court fire in Stevenage, England, killed two firefighters.
- 12–13 February – Windsor Tower fire in Madrid, Spain, caused the building to partially collapse and injured seven.
- 7 March – Higüey Prison fire in the Dominican Republic, killed 134.
- 11 July – Ukhta, Russia, shopping mall fire, caused by arson, killed 25 and injured 15.
- 5 September – Beni Suef Cultural Palace fire in Egypt, killed 46.
- 27 October – A fire at the detention centre of Amsterdam Schiphol Airport, Netherlands, killed 11 and injured 15.
- 11–13 December – Buncefield fire, a major explosion at Hertfordshire Oil Storage Terminal in Hemel Hempstead, England, injured 43.
- 12 December – Liaoyang City Central Hospital fire in Liaoyang, Jilin, China, killed 39.

==== 2006 ====
- 24 February – KTS Composite Textile factory fire in Chittagong, Bangladesh, killed 85 and injured 63.
- 5 March – Edificio Diego Portales (now Centro Cultural Gabriela Mistral) fire in Santiago, Chile, caused a partial collapse.
- 24 August – Trinity Cathedral fire in Saint Petersburg, Russia.
- 22 November – 2006 Kolkata leather factory fire in India killed 9 and injured 18.
- 9 December – A fire in a hospital in Moscow, Russia, killed 45.
- 25 December – Fire at a store in Ormoc, Philippines, killed 25.

==== 2007 ====
- 19 March – Nursing home fire in Kamyshevatskaya, Krasnodar, Russia, killed 63.
- 18 June – Charleston Sofa Super Store Fire in Charleston, South Carolina killed nine.
- 18 August – Penhallow Hotel fire in Newquay, Cornwall, England, killed three and injured five.
- 2 November – 2007 Warwickshire warehouse fire in Atherstone-on-Stour, Warwickshire, England, killed four.

==== 2008 ====
- 7 January – 2008 Icheon fire in Icheon, Gyeonggi-do, South Korea, killed 40.
- 10 February – 2008 Namdaemun fire in Seoul, South Korea, seriously damaged the 14th century structure.
- 4 April – Historic Quebec City Armoury roof and interior destroyed by fire in Quebec, Canada.
- 25 April – Four-storey Rosamor Furniture factory fire in Lissasfa, Casablanca, Morocco, killed 55.

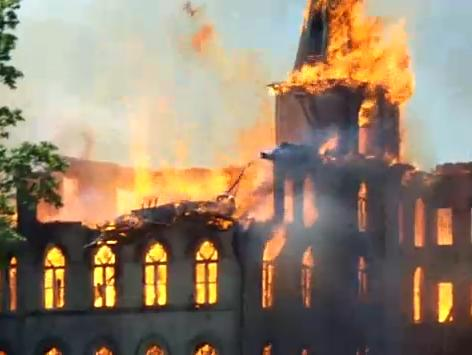
Fire at Alma College (Canada) in May 2008. Only a brick shell remained and was subsequently demolished.

- 28 May – Historic Alma College in St. Thomas, Ontario, Canada, burnt down by arsonists.
- 1 June – 2008 Universal Studios fire in Universal City, California, destroyed the master tapes of as many as a half a million songs recorded during the 20th and 21st centuries.
- 8 June – Texas Governor's Mansion in Austin, Texas, was heavily damaged by an arson attack during an extensive renovation.
- 10 August – Cornwall Court Fire in Hong Kong, killed four.
- 10 August – Toronto propane explosion in North York, Toronto, Canada, killed two.
- 20 September – Wuwang Club fire in Shenzhen, Guangdong, China, killed 43.
- 1 October – Video Parlour Cats fire by arsonist in Nanba, Osaka, Japan, killed 16.
- 20 October – Garrick's Villa near London, England, roof destroyed by fire.

==== 2009 ====
- 1 January – Santika Club fire, in Bangkok, Thailand, killed 66.
- 28 January – 2009 Nakumatt supermarket fire in Nairobi, Kenya, killed 29.
- 9 February – Beijing Television Cultural Center fire in China, killed one and injured seven.
- 13 April – Kamień Pomorski homeless hostel fire in Poland, killed 23.
- 5 June – 2009 Hermosillo daycare center fire in Mexico, killed 49.
- 30 June – Fire in a furnished hotel in Asnières, France, killed 6 and injured 18.
- 3 July – 2009 Lakanal House tower block fire in Camberwell, London, killed six.
- 13 September – 2009 Taldykorgan fire in Almaty Region, Kazakhstan, killed 38.
- 4 December – Lame Horse fire in Perm, Russia, killed 153 and injured over 140.
- 4 December – Medan karaoke bar fire in Medan, Indonesia, killed 20.

=== 2010s ===
==== 2010 ====
- 29 March – Stephen Court historic building fire in Kolkata, India, killed at least 42.
- 6 April – Shirley Towers fire in Southampton, England, killed two firefighters.
- 10 September – 2010 San Bruno explosion in San Bruno, California, six-alarm fire from a gas main killed eight and destroyed dozens of homes.
- 15 November – 2010 Shanghai fire, China, high-rise apartment building fire killed at least 53.
- 8 December – 2010 Santiago prison fire in Chile killed at least 81 inmates in the country's deadliest prison incident.
- 14 December – A fire at a factory in Dhaka, Bangladesh owned by Ha-meem Group, killed 25 and injured 100.
- 17 December – A fire in Provo, Utah destroyed the historic Provo Tabernacle in a four-alarm fire.
- 19 December – A fire at a pension house in Tuguegarao, Philippines, killed 16.

==== 2011 ====
- 25 August – 2011 Monterrey casino attack. An arson attack on a casino in Monterrey, Mexico committed by the Los Zetas drug cartel, killed 52 people.
- 18 November – An arson attack at a nursing home in Quakers Hill, Sydney, Australia, killed 11 elderly residents.
- 21 November – Fire caused by electrical short circuit at a eunuch festival, Delhi, India, killed 15 and injured at least 36.
- 9 December – 2011 AMRI Hospital fire. A fire at AMRI hospital Kolkata, West Bengal, India, mostly caused by toxic fumes spreading through ducts of the central air conditioning system, killed at least 90.

==== 2012 ====
- 14 February – Comayagua prison fire. A prison fire in Comayagua, Honduras, killed over 361 inmates.
- 19 February – A massive fire swept through a market in Tegucigalpa, Honduras, destroying between 500 and 1800 stalls, injured 11.
- 26 June – A fire in a market in Moscow, Russia, killed 17 migrant workers.
- 6 May – Explosions and a fire at Bangkok Synthetics Plant petrochemical plant for synthetic rubber, in the Map Ta Phut industrial estate in Rayong Province, Thailand, killed 12 and injured over 100.
- 28 May – 2012 Villaggio Mall fire. A fire at a mall in Doha, Qatar, killed 19.
- 24 August – 2012 Venezuela Refinery Explosion. An explosion and fire at the Paraguaná Refinery Complex killed 48 and injured 151.
- 11 September – 2012 Pakistan garment factory fires. A fire in a Karachi garment factory killed at least 312 workers.
- 11 September – 2012 Pakistan garment factory fires. A fire in a Lahore shoe factory killed 25 workers.
- 23 October – An arson at the Beinan Branch of Xinyang Hospital, Taiwan, killed 13 patients. The perpetrator, in the final phase of cancer and upset by his illness, received the death penalty, dying during detention in April 2014.
- 24 November – 2012 Dhaka fire. A fire in a Tazreen Fashion factory in Dhaka, Bangladesh, killed at least 124.
- 26 November – A fire a workshop for disabled people in Titisee-Neustadt, Germany, killed 14.

==== 2013 ====
- 27 January – Kiss nightclub fire. A fire in the Kiss nightclub in Santa Maria, Rio Grande do Sul, Brazil, after performers were said to have set off fireworks, killed at least 233.
- 27 February – 2013 Kolkata market fire. A fire in Surya Sen Market, Kolkata, India, killed 18.
- 17 April – West Fertilizer Company explosion in Texas, when probable arson started a fire that detonated hundreds of tons of ammonium nitrate at a fertilizer plant, killed 15 and injured over 160. Nearby apartment buildings were destroyed and windows seven miles (eleven kilometres) away were broken.
- 26 April – 2013 Moscow psychiatric hospital fire in Russia, killed 38.
- 3 June – Jilin Baoyuanfeng poultry plant fire in Mishazi, Jilin, China, killed 119.
- 6 July – Lac-Mégantic rail disaster. An unattended freight train carrying crude oil rolled into Lac-Mégantic, Quebec, Canada, and derailed, resulting in an explosion and fire which destroyed more than 30 buildings in the town's centre, killed 42 with 5 more missing and presumed dead.
- 13 September – A fire at a psychiatric hospital in Luka, Novgorod Oblast, Russia, killed 37.

==== 2014 ====
- 23 January – L'Isle-Verte nursing home fire. A fire in a nursing home in Quebec, Canada, killed 32.
- 8 February – 2014 Medina hotel fire. A fire at a hotel in Medina, Saudi Arabia, killed 15 and injured 130.
- 23 May – The main building of the Glasgow School of Art in Scotland, considered the masterpiece of designer Charles Rennie Mackintosh, was severely damaged by fire.
- 28 May – A fire at a hospital in Jangseong County in South Korea, killed 22 and injured several more.
- 26 September – 2014 air traffic control facility fire. Arson at an air traffic control edifice in Aurora, Illinois (also known as the "Chicago Center") caused close to 2,000 airline flights to undertake emergency landings.
- 29 December – 2014 Lahore shopping centre fire. Fire in Anarkali Bazaar, Lahore, Pakistan, killed at least 13.

==== 2015 ====
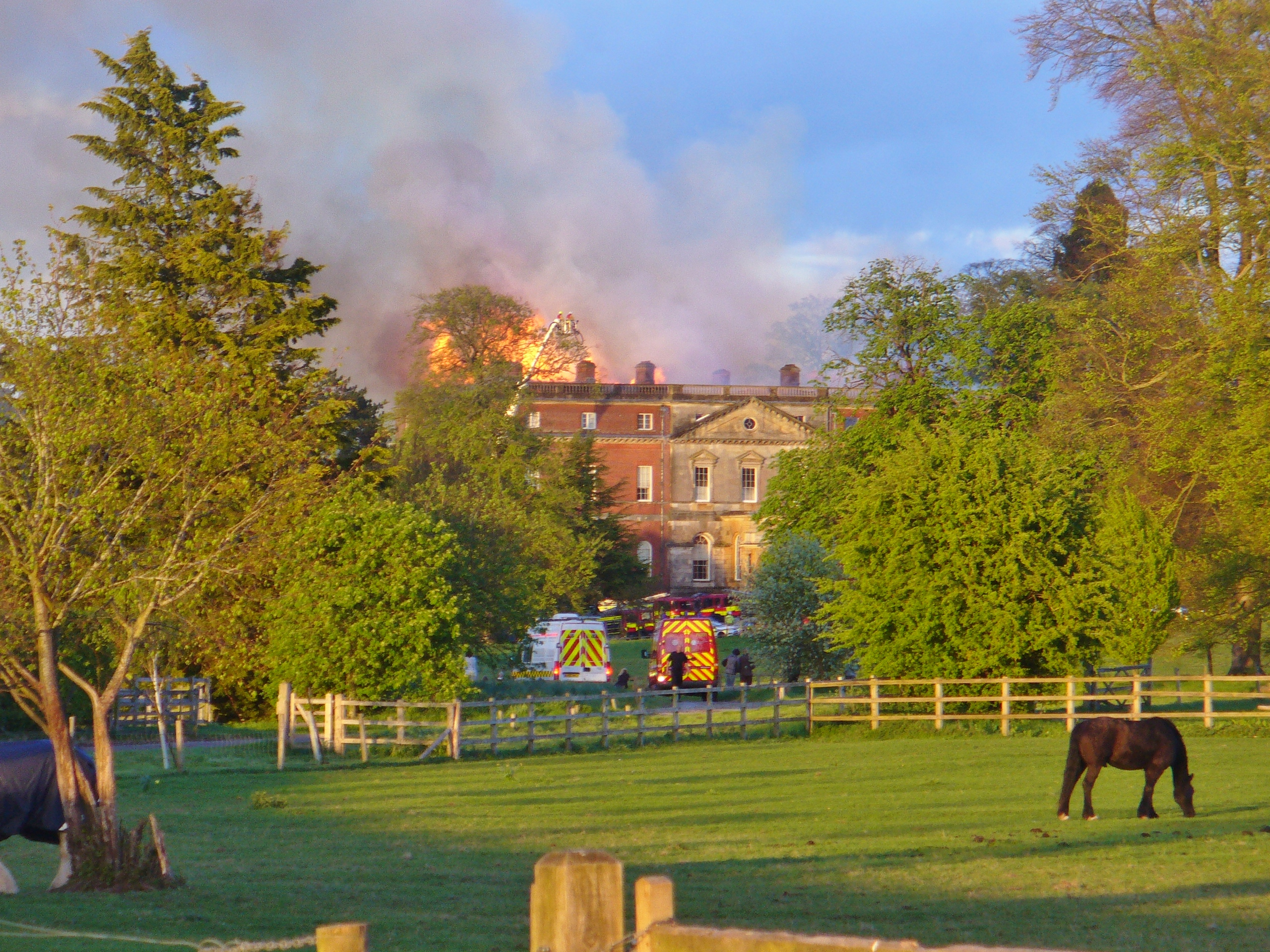
Clandon Park House on fire

- 11 March – 2015 Kazan Shopping Center fire. A fire in Russia killed 17 and injured 55.
- 29 March – Clandon Park House in Surrey, England, burned. Treasures and historic items were destroyed.
- 13 May – 2015 Valenzuela fire. An industrial fire in Valenzuela, Philippines, killed 72.
- 19 May – 2015 Baku residence building fire. A fire in a residence building in Baku, Azerbaijan, killed 14.
- 30 October – Colectiv nightclub fire. A fire at Colectiv nightclub in Bucharest, Romania, killed 64.

==== 2016 ====
- 30 January – A massive fire at a factory in Sokolniki District, Moscow, Russia, killed 12.
- 10 April – Puttingal temple fire. A fireworks accident at the Puttingal Temple in Paravur, India, killed 111.
- 6 August – 2016 Rouen fire. A fire at a birthday party at the Cuba Libre pub in Rouen, France, killed 14.
- 10 August – A hospital fire at Yarmouk Hospital in Baghdad, Iraq, killed 11 newborn babies and injured 29 women. The fire was set deliberately by eight men in order to cover up their theft of 100 million Iraqi dinars. They were later arrested. The minister of health of Iraq later resigned due to the incident.
- 3 September – A fire at the Kaliti Prison during a suspected attempted jailbreak killed at least 23 during the 2016 Ethiopian protests.
- 2 November – A fire at a karaoke lounge in Vietnam, killed 13.
- 9 November – 2016 Bethlehem Steel fire at the old cooling house of a former Bethlehem Steel complex in Lackawanna, New York, mobilized Erie County, New York mutual aid from the City of Buffalo as well as suburban volunteer fire companies to assist the Lackawanna Fire Department. A large plume of black smoke could be seen for miles and was picked up by the local NEXRAD weather radar. A minor injury to a Buffalo firefighter occurred.
- 26 November – A fire almost completely destroyed the Royal Clarence Hotel in Exeter, England.
- 2 December – 2016 Oakland warehouse fire. A fire at a converted warehouse in Oakland, California, killed at least 36.

==== 2017 ====
- 14 June – Grenfell Tower fire. A fire at Grenfell Tower, a 24-storey, 220-foot (67 m) high tower block of public housing flats in North Kensington, London, England. It killed 72.
- 14 July – Marco Polo condo fire. The fire in Honolulu, Hawaii, killed 4 and injured 13.
- 14 September – 2017 Darul Quran Ittifaqiyah madrasa fire. A fire occurred at the Tahfiz Darul Quran Ittifaqiyah School in Kuala Lumpur, Malaysia. At least 24 students and teachers were killed.
- 12 October – Goethe Tower in Frankfurt/Main, Hesse, Germany burnt down.
- 21 December – 2017 Jecheon fire. A gym fire in Jecheon, South Korea, killed 29 and injured 36.
- 23 December – 2017 Davao City mall fire, Philippines. A fire erupted in a shopping mall (NCCC Mall Davao) in Davao City, which killed 38; 37 worked for Survey Sampling International, and one of the mall's employees who was also a part of the mall's emergency response team.
- 27 December – 2017 Bronx apartment fire swept through a Bronx apartment complex; killed 13 and injured 14. It was New York City's worst accidental fire in 25 years.
- 29 December – Kamala Mills fire. A fire killed 14 people and injured 55 at two rooftop restobars in Mumbai, India.

==== 2018 ====
- 26 January – 2018 Sejong Hospital fire. A hospital fire in Miryang, South Korea, killed at least 37 and injured more than 131 in the country's worst fire in over a decade.
- 2 March – 2018 Baku fire. A fire killed 24 at a drug rehabilitation centre in Azerbaijan's capital Baku.
- 23 March – A fire in a large condominium complex in Ho Chi Minh City, Vietnam, killed 13 and injured 28.
- 25 March – 2018 Kemerovo fire. A fire killed 60 people, mostly children, at a mall in Kemerovo, Russia.
- 28 March – 2018 Valencia, Venezuela fire. Rioting and a fire at a police station in Valencia, Venezuela, killed 68.
- 23 April – A suspected arson attack at a karaoke lounge in southern China killed 18 and injured 5.

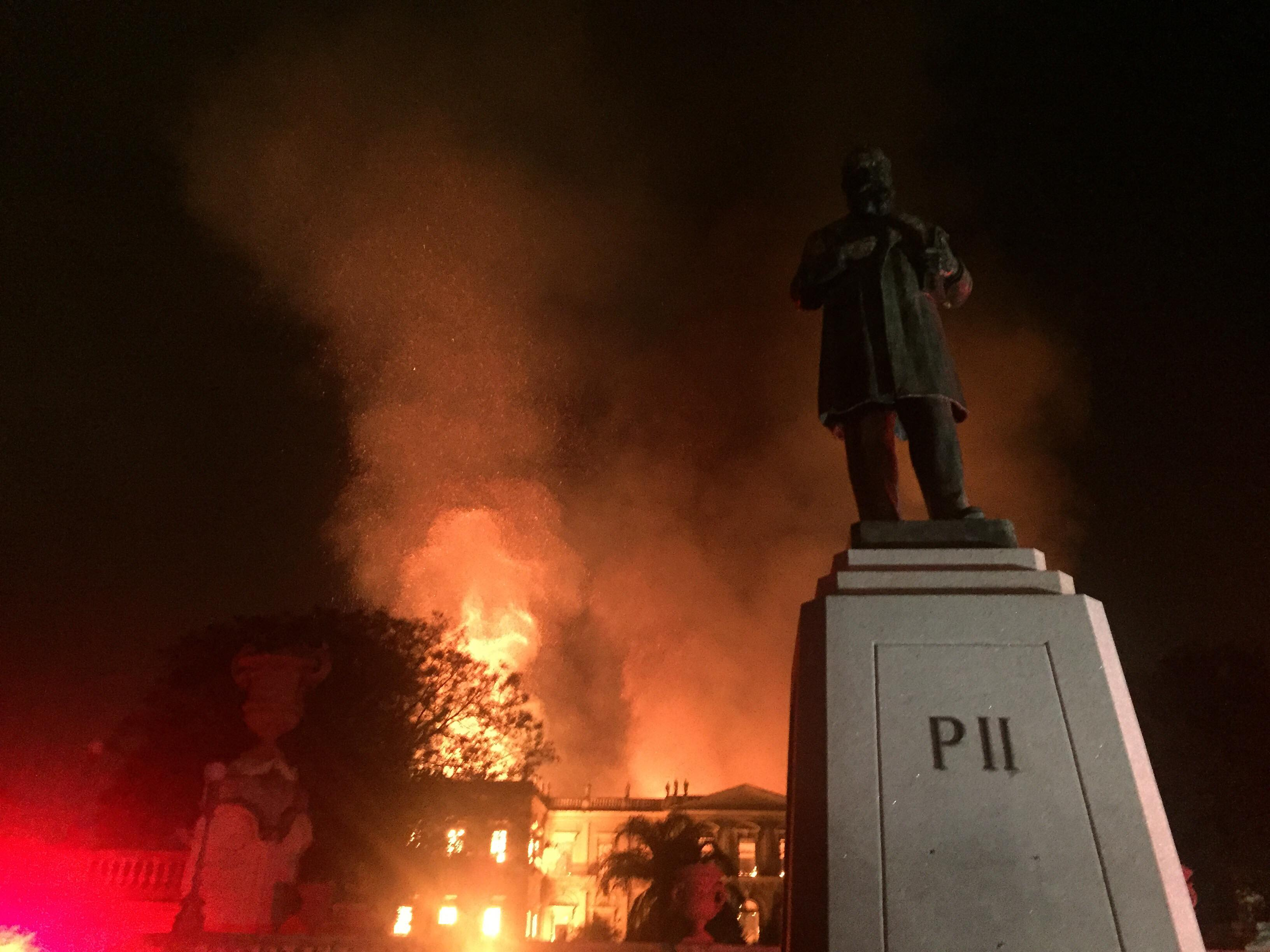
Most of the collections of the National Museum of Brazil were destroyed in a 2018 fire.

- 15 June – The Glasgow School of Art main building, nearing the end of restoration after the fire in 2014, was badly damaged in another fire that destroyed the interior of the adjoining O2 ABC music venue.
- 28 June – A fire at a market in Nairobi, Kenya, killed 15 and injured 70.
- 25 August – 2018 Harbin hotel fire. A fire at a hotel in Harbin, Heilongjiang, China, killed 19 and injured 23.
- 2 September – National Museum of Brazil fire. The National Museum of Brazil in Rio de Janeiro caught fire and lost more than 90% of its collection.

==== 2019 ====
- 4 January – ToNiePokój escape room fire. A fire at an escape room in Koszalin, Poland, killed five teenagers and injured an adult employee. The fire is believed to have been caused by leaking gas cylinders.
- 5 February – A fire at a building in Paris, France, killed 10. It was started by a woman after an altercation with the neighbors, who was later arrested by police.
- 8 February – Ninho do Urubu fire. A fire in a dormitory at a soccer youth team training centre in Flamengo, Brazil, killed 10 teenage players.
- 12 February – 2019 Delhi hotel fire. A fire that broke out at a hotel in Delhi, India, killed 17.

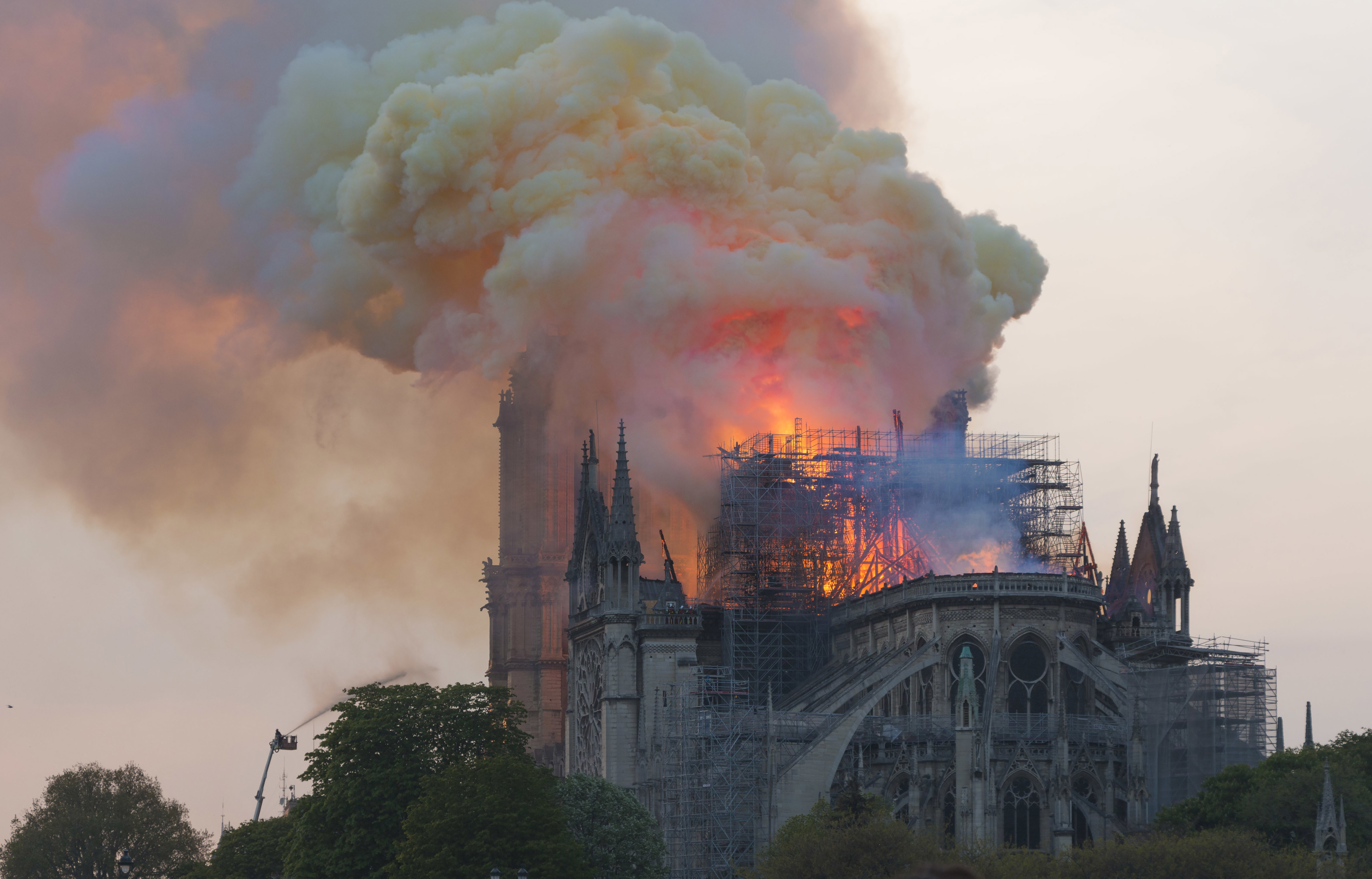
Notre-Dame de Paris fire.

- 15 April – Notre-Dame fire. Roof and spire were destroyed, and heavy damage was done to the interior of the cathedral due to the collapsing spire and roof, along with water and smoke damage. The cathedral was undergoing renovations at the time.
- 24 May – 2019 Surat fire. A fire in a commercial complex in Surat, India, killed 22.
- 18 July – Kyoto Animation arson attack. A man poured gasoline and ignited it at a Kyoto Animation studio, killed 35.
- 27 August – Coatzacoalcos nightclub fire. Gang members set a nightclub in Coatzacoalcos, Mexico on fire after barricading the exits, killed 28.
- 12 September – A fire started in an electric generator behind the intensive care unit of a hospital in Rio de Janeiro, Brazil, killed 14 patients due to asphyxiation from smoke or life support equipment shutdown.
- 18 September – A fire in a boarding school near Monrovia, Liberia, killed 27.
- 2 October – Star City fire. A fire at the Star City amusement park in Pasay, Philippines.
- 22 October – New Zealand International Convention Centre fire. A fire in the roof of an under-construction building led to disruption in Auckland's central business district for three days. The fire was left to burn itself out, four were injured.
- 31 October – A fire at the Shuri Castle led to the loss of all seven key buildings of the castle in Naha, Okinawa Prefecture, Japan.
- 8 December – 2019 Delhi factory fire. A fire in New Delhi, India, killed 43.
- 21 December – Alpine Motel Apartments fire. A fire in Las Vegas, Nevada, killed six residents, making it the deadliest fire ever within the city limits.

=== 2020s ===
==== 2020 ====
- 19 January – A fire at a home for mentally disabled people in Vejprty, Czech Republic, killed 8 and injured 30.
- 18 July – A fire was deliberately set at the Nantes Cathedral in France, destroying the main organ.
- 8 August – Bohumín arson attack in the Czech Republic, killed 11.
- 9 August – 2020 Vijayawada fire in a COVID-19 facility in India, killed 11 and injured 22.
- 20 August – Srisailam hydroelectric power plant fire in India, killed nine.
- 14 November – Piatra Neamț hospital fire in Romania, killed 10.
- 19 December – Gaziantep hospital fire in Turkey, killed nine.

==== 2021 ====
- 21 January – 2021 Kharkiv fire in Ukraine, killed 15 and injured 11.
- 21 January – A fire at a house in Exeter, England killed four people including two children and injured two others.
- 29 January – Matei Balș hospital fire in Bucharest, Romania, killed 17.
- 11 March – A fire at a clothing factory in Cairo, Egypt, killed 20 and injured 24.
- 26 March – A fire at a hospital in Mumbai, India, killed 10.
- 23 April – Virar hospital fire in India, killed 13.
- 24 April – Baghdad hospital fire in Iraq, killed at least 82.
- 28 April – Riga hostel fire in Latvia, killed eight and injured nine.
- 7 June – June 2021 Pune fire in India, killed at least 18.
- 25 June – Zhecheng school fire in China, killed at least 18 and injured 16.
- 9 July – Rupganj factory fire at a food and drink factory in Narayanganj, Bangladesh, killed 52 and injured 20.
- 8 September – Tangerang prison fire in Indonesia, killed 49 and injured 72.
- 8 September – 2021 Tetovo hospital fire in North Macedonia, killed 14.
- 1 October – Constanța hospital fire in Constanța, Romania, killed seven.
- 14 October – 2021 Kaohsiung tower fire in Taiwan, killed 46 and injured 41.
- 8 November – Maradi school fire in Niger, killed 26.
- 17 December – 2021 Osaka building fire in Japan, killed 26.

==== 2022 ====
- 2 January – 2022 Parliament of South Africa fire damaged the Houses of Parliament, in Cape Town.
- 5 January – 2022 Philadelphia apartment fire killed 12.
- 9 January – 2022 Bronx apartment fire in New York City killed at least 17.
- 23 January – Fireworks in a nightclub caused a fire that left 16 dead in Yaoundé, Cameroon.
- 13 May – 2022 Delhi fire in India killed 27.
- 9 June – Daegu office fire in South Korea killed seven.
- 4 July – Fire at the historic Police Headquarters, also known as Line Barracks or Casernes Centrales, in Port Louis, Mauritius; at two separate locations of the compounds of the Special Supporting Unit (SSU) No. 4, at a warehouse and then at the office premises.
- 5 August – Mountain B nightclub fire in Thailand killed 20 people and injured 35.
- 14 August – Giza church fire in Egypt killed at least 41 people.
- 6 September – 2022 Binh Duong karaoke bar fire in Vietnam, killed 33 people.
- 16 September – Lotus Garden China Telecom Building fire in Changsha, China.
- 2 October – 2022 Bhadohi fire in India killed 17.
- 14 November – A residential fire in Navotas, Philippines, killed five people and injured two.
- 17 November – 2022 Jabalia fire in the Gaza Strip killed 21 people.
- 21 November – 2022 Anyang factory fire in China killed 38 people.
- 24 November – 2022 Ürümqi fire in China killed 10 and injured 9.
- 16 December – Vaulx-en-Velin fire in France killed 10 and injured 14.
- 24 December – 2022 Kemerovo nursing home fire in Russia killed 22 and injured 6.

==== 2023 ====
- 2 January – New County Hotel fire in Scotland, killed 3 and injured 11.
- 19 January – A fire at a military barracks in Azat, Armenia, killed 15 and injured 7.
- 6 February – A fire in a house in Charly-sur-Marne, France, killed eight and injured one.
- 3 March – Plumpang oil depot fire in Indonesia, killed 17 when an oil depot caught on fire and exploded, with the fire spreading to nearby dense residential areas.
- 27 March – Ciudad Juárez migrant center fire in Mexico, killed 40 migrants.
- 15 April – An apartment fire in Dubai, United Arab Emirates, killed 16 and injured 9.
- 18 April – Beijing hospital fire in China, killed 29.
- 21 April – A restaurant fire in Madrid killed 3 and injured 20.
- 3 May – Brno container fire in the Czech Republic, killed eight.
- 6 May – Yanaquihua gold mine fire in Peru, killed 27.
- 16 May – Wellington hostel fire at Loafers Lodge in New Zealand, killed at least six.
- 21 May – Mahdia School Dormitory Fire in Guyana killed at least 20 children.
- 21–22 May – A fire at the Manila Central Post Office in the Philippines, destroyed the headquarters of the country's postal service.
- 4 June – A historic building situated on Huty Julia 10 in Bytom, Poland was set ablaze.
- 21 June – A fire at the Paris American Academy fashion school in France killed 1 and injured 50.
- 22 July – Beer House Cantina arson in Mexico killed 13 and injured 4.
- 5 August – The Crooked House, a historic pub and former farmhouse in Staffordshire, England, was gutted by fire.
- 9 August – A fire at a gîte housing mentally disabled people on holiday in Wintzenheim, France, killed 11.
- 31 August – Johannesburg building fire in South Africa killed at least 73.
- 31 August – A fire at a house also functioning as a clothing factory in Quezon City, Philippines, killed 15 people.
- 13 September – Hanoi building fire in Vietnam killed at least 56.
- 26 September – Qaraqosh wedding fire in Iraq killed at least 113.
- 1 October – Fonda Milagros nightclub fire in Spain killed 13 people.
- 3 November – Langarud drug rehabilitation centre fire in Iran killed 32 people.
- 16 November – Luliang building fire in China killed 26 people.
- 25 November – Karachi mall fire in Pakistan killed 11 people.
- 25 November – A restaurant fire at the Syrian House building in Paris killed three and injured eight.
- 8 December – Erbil university fire in Iraq killed 14 people.
- 17 December – Conakry oil depot fire in Guinea, killed 24 people.
- 31 December – A fire destroyed the 17th century Château du Grand-Serquigny in France.

==== 2024 ====
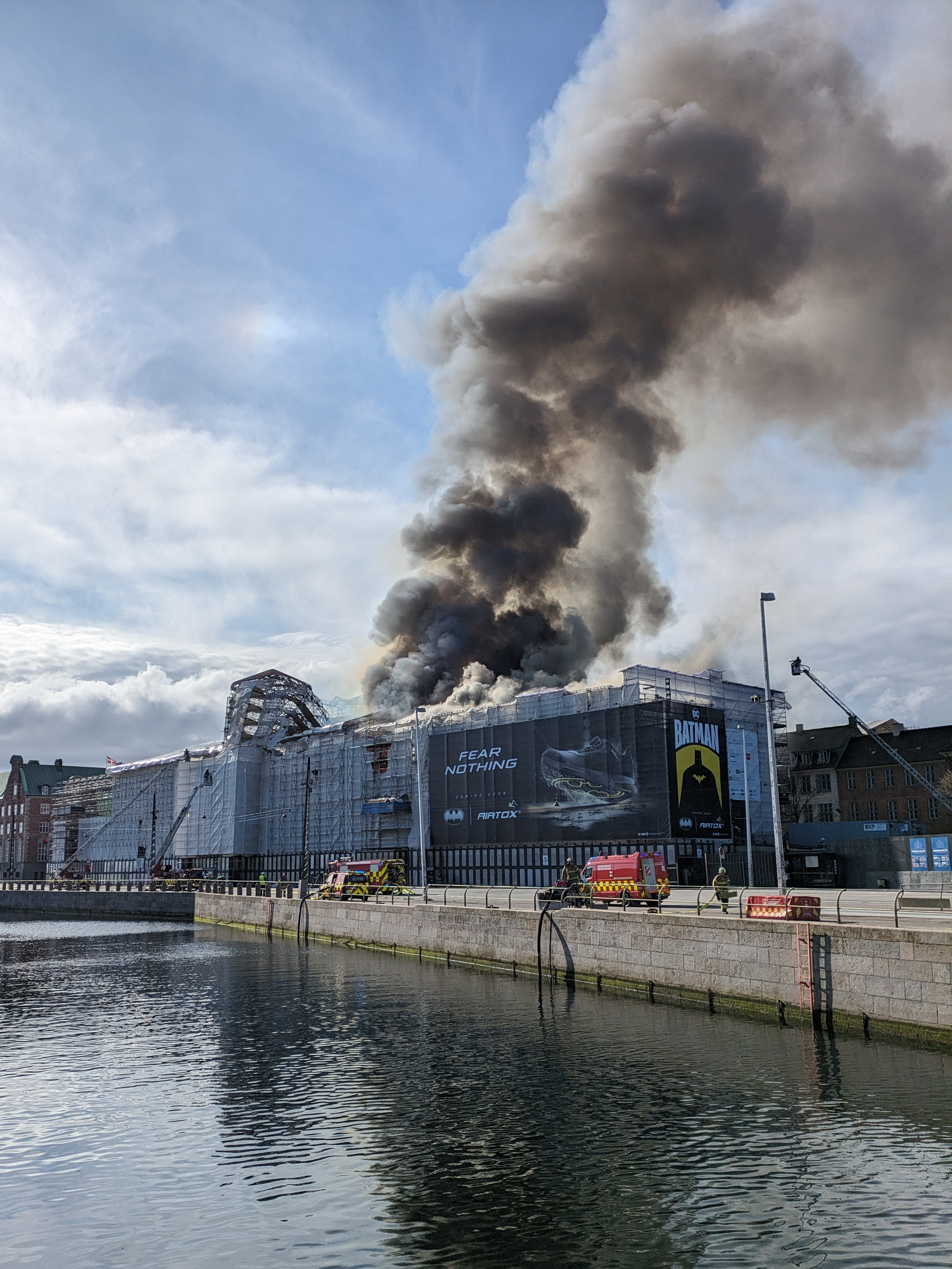
Old Stock Exchange fire, April 2024, Copenhagen, Denmark

- 1 January – A fire at a New Year's party inside a bar in Graz, Austria, killed 1 person and severely injured 21 others.
- 4 January – A fire at a hospital in Uelzen, Lower Saxony, Germany, killed 5 patients and injured 22 others, including 6 seriously.
- 19 January – Yingcai Boarding School fire in China killed 13.
- 23 January – National Art Gallery of Abkhazia fire in Sukhumi destroyed all but 150 of its 4,000 paintings.
- 24 January – Xinyu shopping area fire in China killed at least 39.
- 30 January – Guizhou fire hydrant incident in China killed one.
- 6 February – A fire at a fireworks factory in Harda, Madhya Pradesh, India, killed 11 people and injured 150 others.
- 10 February – Chinon Nuclear Power Plant fire in France caused two nuclear reactors to shut down.
- 12 February – Oceana Waterpark fire in Sweden killed 1 person, injured 22 others, caused the evacuation of a nearby hotel and office facilities and destroyed the waterpark.
- 15 February – A fire at a paint factory in New Delhi killed 11.
- 22 February – 2024 València residential complex fire in Spain killed 10.
- 23 February – 2024 Nanjing building fire in China killed 15.
- 29 February – 2024 Dhaka Bailey Road fire in Bangladesh killed 46.
- 4 March – 4 people were killed and 21 others injured in a fire at a nursing home in Bedburg-Hau, North Rhine-Westphalia, Germany.
- 2 April – Gayrettepe nightclub fire in Turkey killed 29.
- 10 April – A fire at the New Lucky House in Hong Kong killed 5 and injured 36.
- 4 April – A fire at a 39-storey residential apartment building in Sharjah, United Arab Emirates, killed 5 people and injured 44 others.
- 16 April – Børsen fire in Denmark destroyed a large part of the historic Stock Exchange Building in Copenhagen while the building was undergoing renovation.
- 20 April – A fuel depot in Kardymovsky District, Russia, was set on fire by a Ukrainian drone attack.
- 26 April – 2024 Porto Alegre fire in Brazil killed 10 and injured 11.
- 2 May – Henan University Minglun Campus auditorium fire.
- 22 May – A fire at an apartment in Hanoi, Vietnam, killed 14 people and injured 6.
- 25 May – 2024 Rajkot gaming zone fire in India killed 27 people.
- 25 May – A fire at a hospital in New Delhi, India killed seven people and injured five.
- 12 June – 2024 Mangaf building fire in Kuwait killed 50 people and injured 50.
- 17 June – A fire at a house in Newnan, Georgia, killed six people, including three children.
- 18 June – A fire at a hospital in Rasht, Iran, killed nine patients, all of whom were in the intensive care unit.
- 24 June – Aricell battery factory fire in South Korea killed 23 people and injured 8.
- 24 June – A fire at an eight-storey office building in Fryazino, Russia, killed eight people and injured three.
- 29 June – A fire at a dormitory building in Moscow Oblast, Russia, killed five people.
- 29 June – A fire at a fireworks warehouse in Zamboanga City, Philippines, caused an explosion, damaged houses and killed 5 people and injured 38 others.
- 7 July – A fire at a nursing home in Treinta y Tres, Uruguay, killed 10 people.
- 11 July – Rouen Cathedral fire in France damaged the spire.
- 17 July – A fire at a shopping centre in Zigong, China, killed 16 people.
- 2 August – A fire in a five-storey building in Manila, Philippines, killed 11 people.
- 21 August – Atchutapuram pharmaceutical factory explosion in India killed 18 people and injured 41 others.
- 21 August – A house fire in Bradford, England, killed four people, including three children, and injured one other.
- 22 August – A fire at a hotel in Bucheon, South Korea, killed 7 people and injured 12 others.
- 26 August – Freshwater Road fire. A fire at a block of flats in Dagenham, London.
- 5 September – A fire at a primary school in Nyeri County, Kenya killed at least 21 students and injured 27.
- 29 September – 2024 Conyers BioLab fire in the U.S., resulted in shelter-in-place restrictions being emitted for 90,000 residents across several Georgia counties.
- 3 October – Nine people were killed in a fire at the Antai Tian-Sheng Memorial Hospital in Pingtung County, Taiwan.
- 28 October – 2024 Nileshwar temple fireworks disaster in India killed four people.
- 15 November – 10 people were killed in a fire at a nursing home in Villafranca de Ebro, Spain.
- 15 November – 10 infants were killed in a fire at the neonatal ward of a hospital in Jhansi, India.
- 13 December – A fire at a private elderly care centre in Amman, Jordan, killed six people and injured five others.
- 18 December – An arson attack at a cafe in Hanoi, Vietnam, killed 11 people and injured 2 others.
- 19 December – A fire at a food-processing building in Taichung, Taiwan, killed nine people.
- 30 December – A fire at a hotel in Bangkok, Thailand, killed three and injured seven others.

==== 2025 ====
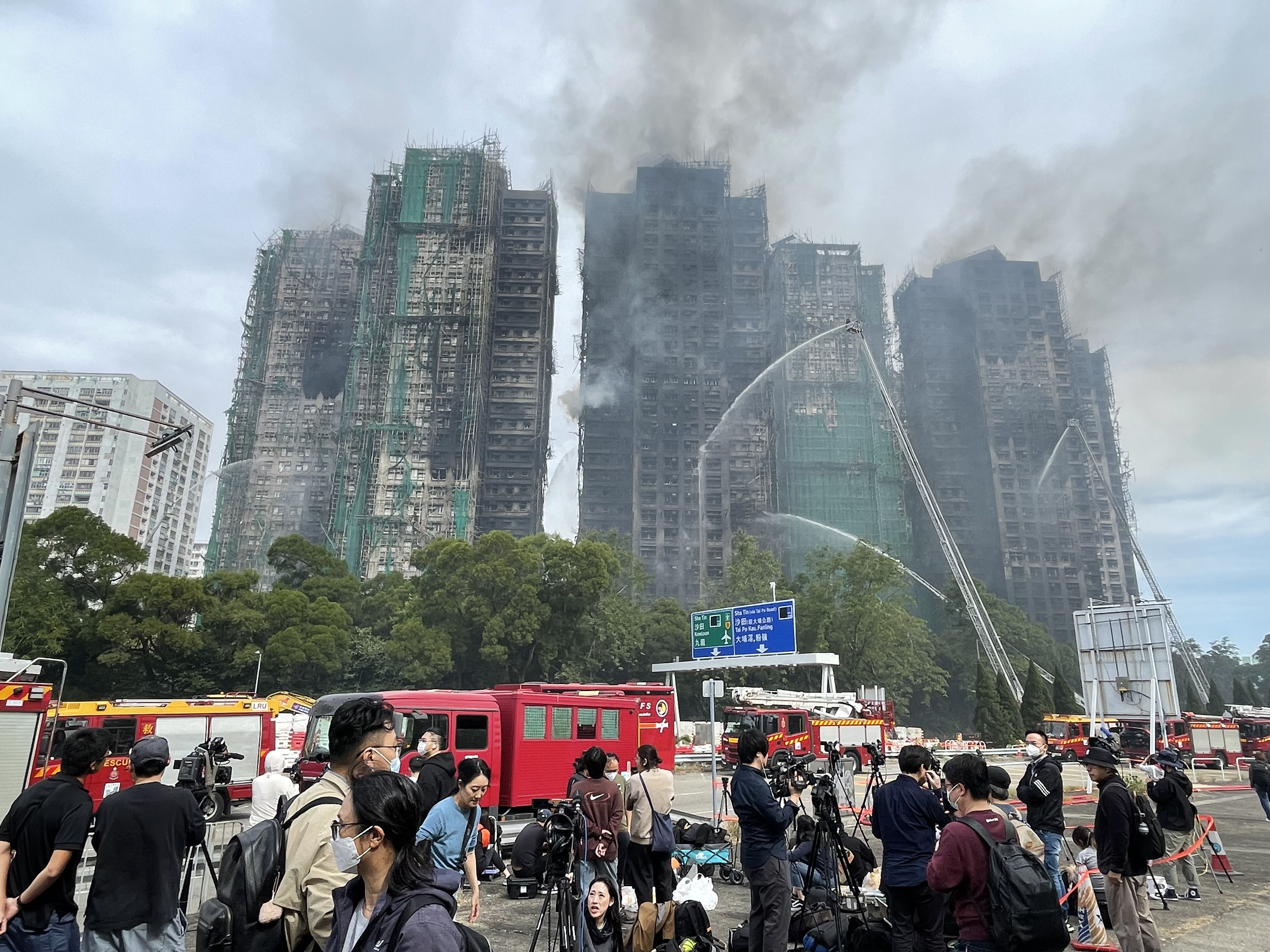
Wang Fuk Court Fire.

- 4 January – A fire at a vegetable market in Zhangjiakou, China, killed 8 people and injured 15.
- 11 January – Most restaurant explosion in the Czech Republic killed seven people and injured seven others.
- 20 January – An arson attack at a retirement home in Belgrade, Serbia, killed eight people and injured seven others.
- 21 January – 2025 Kartalkaya hotel fire in Turkey killed 78 people and injured 51 others.
- 21 January – A tank containing a highly flammable substance at the Port of Barcelona in Spain exploded and caused a fire, killing one person and injuring several others including one critically.
- 1 February – A fire in a retirement home in Bouffémont, France, killed three people and injured nine others.
- 5 February – A fire at an Islamic school in Kaura Namoda, Nigeria killed at least 17 children and injured at least 17 others.
- 14 February – A fire at a resort construction site in Busan, South Korea, killed 6 people and injured 25 others.
- 27 February – A fire at a three-storey residential building in Quezon City, Philippines, killed eight people and injured one.
- 6 March – 2025 Arnhem city fire in the Netherlands destroyed a block of shops and upstairs apartments in the historic city centre.
- 16 March – Kočani nightclub fire in North Macedonia killed 61 people and injured 196.
- 27 March – A fire at a hotel in Uludağ, Turkey, killed two people including alpine skier Berkin Usta, and injured four others.
- 1 April – 2025 Gujarat factory fire in India killed 21 people.
- 8 April – A fire at a nursing home in Chengde, China, killed 20 people.
- 29 April – 2025 Liaoyang restaurant fire in China killed 22 people.
- 29 April – A fire at the Rituraj Hotel in Kolkata, India, killed 14 people.
- 11 May – A fire at a four-storey apartment building in Milwaukee killed five people and injured three others.
- 18 May – 2025 Gulzar Houz fire in India killed 17 people.
- 20 May – Pingshan County textile factory arson case A 27-year-old man set fire to a textile factory in Pingshan, Sichuan, China, injuring a staff member, with authorities attributing the attack to psychological issues and denying rumors of a wage dispute.
- 30 June – Telangana chemical factory explosion in India killed 44 people and injured 33.
- 1 June – A fire at a drug rehabilitation centre in San José Iturbide, Mexico, killed 12 people.
- 5 June – A fire at an apartment building in Rheims, France, killed four people.
- 9 June – A fire at an apartment building in Laon, France, killed two firefighters.
- 7 July – Ramses Exchange fire in Egypt killed 4 people and injured 27, in addition to causing a reduction in nationwide connectivity levels.
- 13 July – 2025 Fall River assisted-living fire in Massachusetts killed 10 people and injured 30.
- 16 July – 2025 Kut shopping mall fire in Iraq killed 61.
- 28 July – A fire at a holiday home for disabled people in Montmoreau, France, killed three people.
- 10 August – A fire at a house in Waldorf, Maryland, killed six people.
- 16 September – A fire at the seven-storey Afriland Towers in Lagos, Nigeria, killed 10 people.
- 14 October – 2025 Dhaka garment factory fire in Bangladesh killed 16 people.
- 1 November – 2025 Hermosillo convenience store fire in Mexico killed 24 people and injured 12.
- 4 November – Tuzla retirement home fire in Bosnia and Herzegovina killed at least 17 people and injured over 35, including firefighters.
- 8 November – A fire at a perfume depot in Dilovası, Turkey, killed six people and injured one.
- 26 November – Wang Fuk Court fire in Hong Kong killed 168.
- 30 November – A fire at a house in Neuves-Maisons, France, killed five.
- 4 December – A fire at a restaurant in Huancane, Peru, killed 10.
- 6 December – 2025 Arpora nightclub fire in India killed 25.
- 9 December – 2025 Terra Drone Building fire in Indonesia killed 22.
- 9 December – 2025 Shantou residential fire in China killed 12.
- 15 December – A explosion in a small apartment building caused by a suicide by gas, in Trévoux, France, killed three.
- 28 December – A fire at a retirement home in Manado, Indonesia, killed 16.

==== 2026 ====
- 1 January – 2026 Vondelkerk fire in the Netherlands completely destroyed the building.
- 1 January – 2026 Crans-Montana bar fire in Switzerland killed 41.
- 17 January – 2026 Gul Plaza Shopping Mall fire in Pakistan killed 80.
- 26 January – A fire at a food factory near Trikala, Greece, killed five.
- 29 January – A fire at an assisted living facility in Ostend, Belgium, killed two.
- 30 January – A fire at a restaurant in Kolkata, India, killed 25.
- 13 February – A fire at a residential building in Budakeszi, Hungary, killed 3 and injured 22.
- 16 February – A fire at a five-storey apartment building in Manlleu, Catalonia, Spain, killed five and injured five.
- 17 February – A fire at the historic Teatro Sannazaro in Naples, Italy, severely damaged the theatre and injured some people.
- 8 March – Union Street fire in Scotland destroyed the Union Corner building.
- 16 March – A fire at a hospital in Cuttack, India, killed 10.
- 17 March – A fire at an oil refinery in Dos Bocas, Mexico, killed five.
- 20 March – 2026 Daejeon factory fire in South Korea killed 14.
- 7 April – 2026 Kimberly-Clark distribution center fire in Ontario, California.
- 15 April – A fire at the Geelong Oil Refinery in Victoria, Australia, caused serious disruptions in the country's fuel supply.
- 28 April – A fire at a construction site in Moscow, Russia, killed 7 and injured 13.
- 28 May – Utumishi Girls' fire in Kenya killed 16.
- 3 June – 2026 Delhi hotel fire in India killed 22.
- 3 June – A fire at an unregistered nursing home in Anguruwatota, Sri Lanka, killed 13.
- 22 June – A fire at a three-storey commercial building in Lucknow, India, killed 15.
- 9 July – Huiteng Shoes factory fire in China killed 28.
- 12 July – 2026 Bangkok pub fire in Thailand killed 41.
- 16 July – A fire at an orphanage in Algiers, Algeria, killed 11 and injured 19.
- 22 July – A house fire in Lima, Peru, killed 10.
- 9 August – A factory fire in Riyadh, Saudi Arabia, killed 16.
- 25 August – A fire at the Amur Gas Chemical Complex in Amur Oblast, Russia, killed 15.
- 26 August – 2026 PIMS hospital fire in Pakistan killed 14 infants.
- 4 September – A fire at a wedding party in Kinshasa, Democratic Republic of the Congo, killed 22.
- 7 September – A fire at a market in Paniai Regency, Indonesia, killed 11.
- 11 September – 2026 Chile nursing home fire killed 16.
- 28 September – A fire at a fireworks factory in Kubrinsk, Russia, killed 14.
- 8 November – A fire at an apartment building in Taiyuan, China, killed 14.
- 15 November – A fire at a building in Phuket, Thailand, killed 11.
- 21 November – A fire at a candy factory in Banten, Indonesia, killed three.

== See also ==
- List of fires
- List of town and city fires
- List of fires at places of worship
- List of fires in high-rise buildings
