= Little Kentucky =

Little Kentucky may refer to:

- Little, Kentucky, an unincorporated community in Breathitt County, Kentucky
- Little Kentucky River, a tributary of the Ohio River
