= York Hotel =

York Hotel may refer to:

- York Hotel, Kalgoorlie, a heritage hotel in Western Australia
- York Hotel, Adelaide, a 19th century Australian hotel developed by C. A. Hornabrook
- York Hotel, Redcar, an English hotel that was the site of the York Hotel Fire in 1970.

== See also ==
- Fairmont Royal York, a hotel in Toronto
