= 2025 Liaoyang restaurant fire =

2025 Liaoyang Restaurant Fire
- Time: Around 12:25, 29 April 2025 (UTC+8)
- Location: No. 160-11 Minzhu Road, Building 68-5 Sanlijie, Baita District, Liaoyang, Liaoning, China; 41.2442853°N 123.1654876°E
- Deaths: 22
- Injuries: 3

On 29 April 2025, a fire broke out at a restaurant in Baita District, Liaoyang, Liaoning, China, resulting in 22 deaths and at least 3 injuries.

== Background ==
At 12:25 on 29 April 2025, a fire occurred at the Sanli Chuniang Restaurant, located near the Sanlizhuang resettlement buildings in Baita District, Liaoyang. Witnesses reported that strong winds were blowing at the time; the fire initially produced black smoke before rapidly spreading.

Local fire services dispatched 22 fire trucks and 85 firefighters to the scene. Visible flames were extinguished by around 12:43. Rescue operations concluded later that afternoon. The fire caused 22 deaths and 3 injuries; all injured individuals were reported to be in stable condition.

== Investigation ==
The cause of the fire remains under investigation. According to information released at a press conference held in Liaoyang on 30 April, preliminary findings identified the ignition point as the side of the restaurant entrance. Authorities ruled out both a gas explosion and deliberate arson. Investigators are examining possibilities such as discarded cigarettes and electrical faults. Officials reported that highly flammable furnishings and interior décor, combined with strong outdoor winds, rapidly blocked exits and caused trapped individuals to inhale large amounts of toxic smoke, leading to fatal asphyxiation. Firefighters described the restaurant interior as filled with thick black smoke, with overturned tables and chairs creating challenging conditions.

== Reactions ==
General Secretary and President Xi Jinping and Premier Li Qiang each issued instructions ordering full medical treatment for the injured and proper follow-up arrangements. The State Council Work Safety Committee announced that it would supervise the investigation, and the Ministry of Emergency Management dispatched a working group to the site. The restaurant's operator was taken into police custody.

Liaoning Party Secretary and Chairman of the Standing Committee of the Provincial People's Congress Hao Peng, together with Governor Wang Xinwei, traveled to Liaoyang overnight to guide follow-up work and visit the injured.

== See also ==
- List of building or structure fires
