= Langarud drug rehabilitation center fire =

2023 fatal blaze in Iran

- Date: 3 November 2023
- Location: Langarud, Gilan province, Iran
- Type: Structure fire
- Deaths: 32
- Injuries: 16

On 3 November 2023, a fire broke out in a drug rehabilitation center in Langarud, Iran, killing at least 32 people and injuring 16.

== Background ==
Iran has one of the world's highest rates of opiate use, with an estimated 2.8 million users according to the United Nations Office on Drugs and Crime. The country also lies on the main trafficking route for poppy, the source of opium and heroin, from Afghanistan to Europe. A UN drug report in 2023 said that 47% of global heroin and morphine seizures originating from Afghanistan in 2020 came from Iran.

The center, which was named "The First Step Toward Freedom", catered to opium addicts and was designed to accommodate up to 40 people. However, deputy governor of Gilan province Mohammad Jalai said that the facility was overcrowded at the time of the fire.

== Events ==
The fire broke out in the early morning of 3 November 2023 and then spread across the center, resulting in the roof collapsing. The chief justice of Gilan told local media that at least 32 people had been killed while 16 others were hospitalized. Four of the injured were described as in critical condition.

== Investigation ==
Jalai told Fars news agency that the blaze appeared to have been caused by a heater which caught fire and set nearby curtains alight. The center's manager and several others were arrested as part of the investigation.

== See also ==
- List of building or structure fires
