= Lanjisu internet cafe fire =

2002 arson attack in Beijing, China

- Location of the fire in Beijing
- Date: June 16, 2002
- Time: 02:40 (CST)
- Location: 39.997°N 116.361°E
- Type: Arson
- Deaths: 25
- Injuries: 13

At around 2:40 am on June 16, 2002, a fire broke out at a two-story internet cafe in Haidian district, Beijing. Twenty-five people died and 13 others were injured. Many of the dead and injured people were university students. The fire was the deadliest fire in Beijing in over 50 years. The fire was an arson; four youngsters were punished for the crime.

== Background ==
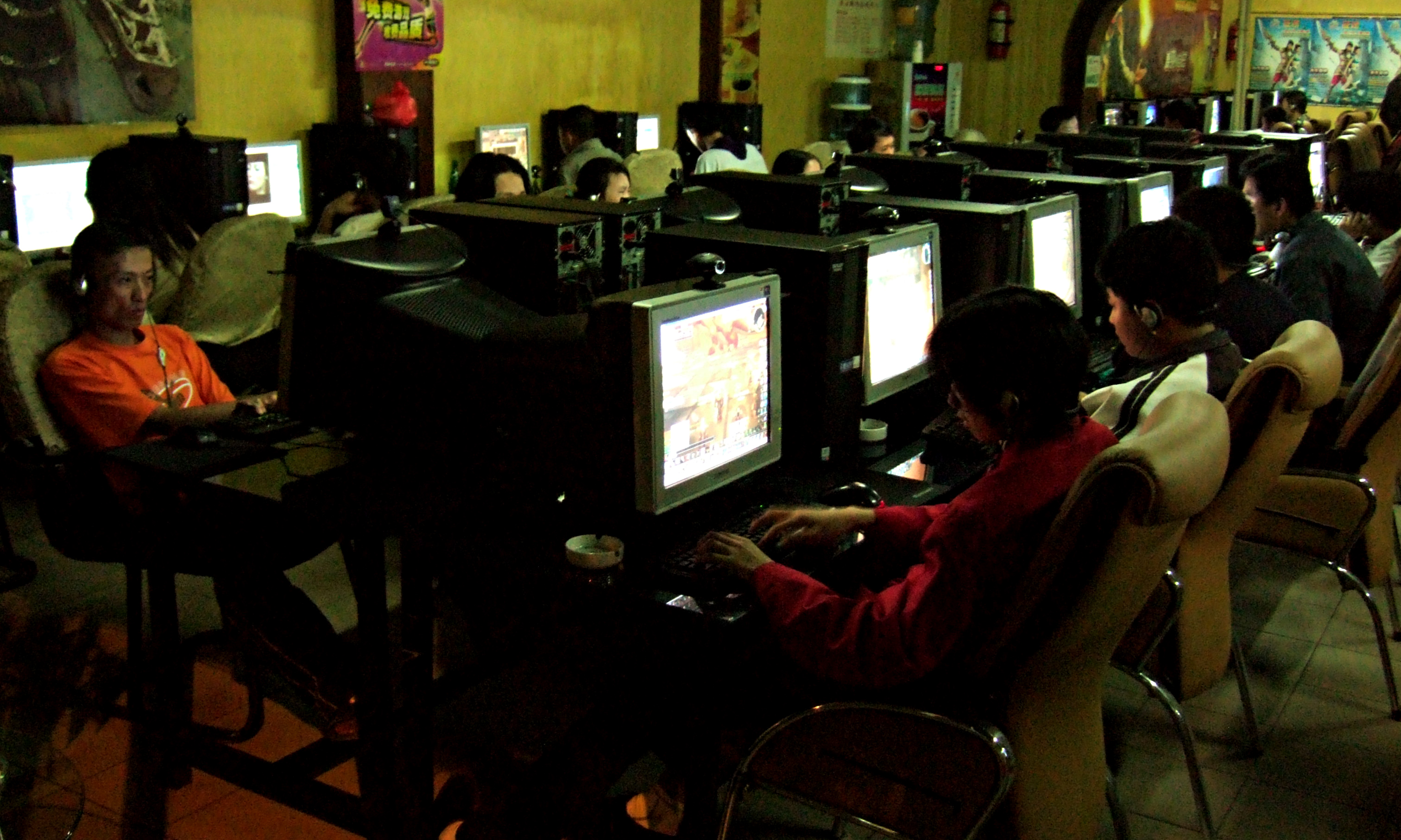
An internet cafe in China in 2006

Lanjisu ("Blue Speed") internet cafe was an unlicensed two-story establishment located in Haidian, Beijing's university district. At the time, illegal internet cafes were common: according to authorities, only 200 out of 2,400 internet cafes in the city had permits. The operator was Zheng Wenjing, a 36-year-old engineer, assisted by his girlfriend, Zhang Minmin.

Two boys, 14-year-old Song and 13-year-old Zhang, confessed to lighting the fire out of revenge after a dispute with staff. On television news, one of the boys was shown telling investigators, "I burned the Lanjisu with gasoline because they would not let us play there." The boys plotted the arson two weeks in advance.

== Fire ==
Song and Zhang purchased 1.8 liters of gasoline from a nearby gas station at 11:00 PM on June 15, a few hours before setting fire to the internet cafe.

The fire broke out at 2:40 am. At the time, the cafe was crowded. Making matters worse, the windows of the cafe had been barred, and there was just one door, which was kept locked. The fire was put out by 3:30 am. The fire claimed 25 lives, and 13 were injured. Many of the victims were students from eight nearby universities. The fire was the deadliest in Beijing in more than 50 years.

== Consequences ==
Beijing Mayor Liu Qi ordered Beijing internet cafes to close for safety inspections. Only properly licensed establishments would be allowed to reopen.

Cafe owner Zhang Wenjing turned himself in. For illegally operating the cafe, he was sentenced to 3 years in prison and was fined 300,000 yuan. His girlfriend Zhang Minmin was sentenced to 1 year and 6 months in prison, and was fined 200,000 yuan. The gas station which sold the teenagers the gasoline was fined 50,000 yuan.

Of the four culprits, two boys were sentenced to life in prison, a female accomplice was sentenced to a 12-year prison term, and another boy was sent to a Beijing reform school.
