= Luliang building fire =

2023 fire in Shanxi, China

A building fire in Luliang City broke out at around 6:50 a.m. on November 16, 2023, in the Yongju Coal Industry Joint Construction Building, Shanxi Province, Lishi District, People's Republic of China. The building on fire has four floors, and the fire point is located in the bathroom on the second floor. As of the afternoon of the same day, the number of people killed rose to 26, and 38 people were injured. A total of 70 people were evacuated in the accident. The cause of the fire is under investigation, it is reported that the fire started from the locker room hanging basket.

The People's Republic of China officially called it "Yongju Coal Industry Office Building "11.16" Major Fire Accident".

== Background and experience ==
Yongju Coal Industry is a private enterprise under Luliang Dongtai Group, with an approved production capacity of 1.5 million tons per year, and is mainly engaged in coal mining, washing and sales.The company has been involved in a number of labor dispute litigation cases, and problems were found in two random inspections in 2018 and 2019.

The fire occurred in the Lianjian Building of the enterprise. It has four floors on the ground and is a reinforced concrete frame structure with a total construction area of 6,920 square meters. The first floor is the comprehensive service area for workers, the second floor is the staff bathroom, the third floor is the office area for management personnel, and the fourth floor is the dispatch center. The fire point is located in the bathroom on the second floor.

The bathhouses of coal mine workers use hanging baskets to place miners' clothes. There are many flammable substances such as cotton overalls and coal dust carried on the clothes in the hanging basket, and at the same time, there is sufficient oxygen, which has a greater risk of fire. And the bottom of the hanging basket is very high from the ground, usually on the roof, making it more difficult to extinguish the fire. At the beginning of the fire, the employees extinguished the fire on their own. Most of the people were unknown and no people were evacuated.

== Government response ==
On November 17, the Safety Commission of the State Council supervised the investigation and handling of the fire accident in Luliang, Shanxi.

13 people, including the actual controller, main person in charge, and other responsible persons of Luliang Yongju Coal Industry, were taken into criminal compulsory measures.
