= Hotel Caledonien fire =

1986 fire in Kristiansand, Norway

- Date: 5 September 1986
- Location: Kristiansand, Norway; 58.1425°N 7.9946°E
- Type: Fire
- Deaths: 14

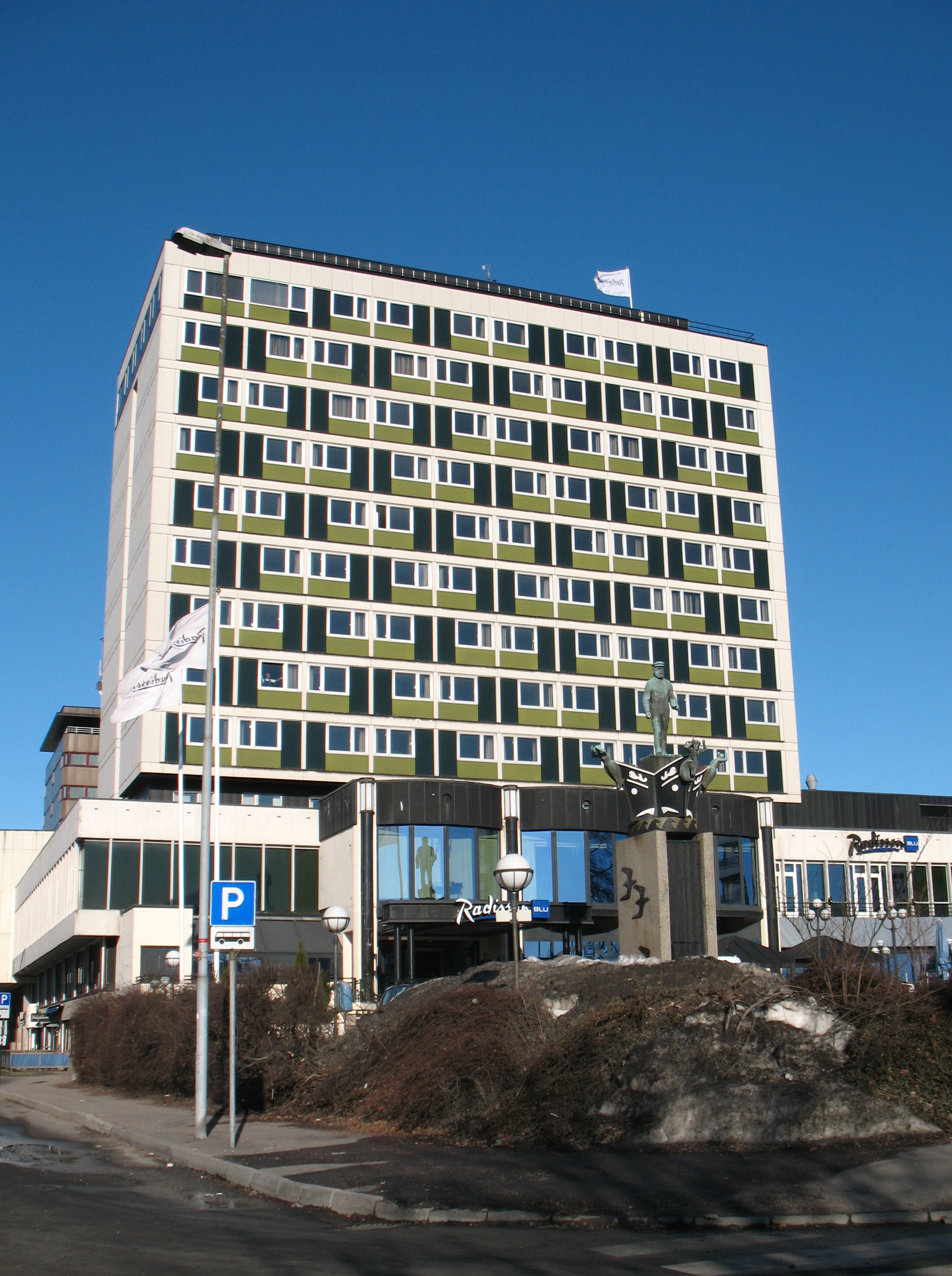
Hotel Caledonien, Vestre Strandgate 7, Kristiansand

The Hotel Caledonien fire took place at the 12-story Hotel Caledonien in Kristiansand, Norway, on 5 September 1986. The fire alarm was received at 04:40 in the morning. There were 14 fatalities, and more than 100 people were rescued. Rescue operations included a helicopter lifting persons off the roof and off upper story windows stories.

The rescue work was difficult. The development of smoke meant that none of the hotel guests managed to get out through the escape routes inside the hotel, and they therefore had to be rescued through the windows. The fire brigade's ladders did not reach the upper floors, and several people therefore had to be rescued with the help of a helicopter. A total of 86 people stayed in this part of the hotel. Of these, 70 were brought out alive via fire brigade ladders, mobile cranes or helicopters, while 2 saved their lives by jumping from windows. The windows in the guest rooms could not be opened because the handles had been removed, and many of the guests therefore broke the windows to get fresh air, before they were rescued. All those who died died of smoke poisoning.

Hotel Caledonien was rebuilt after the fire.
