= Qingshuihe explosion =

1993 industrial disaster in Shenzhen, China

Qingshuihe explosion 清水河大爆炸
- Location: China; Qingshuihe Subdistrict, Luohu District, Shenzhen City, Guangdong Province
- Date: August 5, 1993; 13:30 (UTC+8)
- Deaths: 18
- Injuries: 873

Qingshuihe explosion (清水河大爆炸) is a chemical explosion occurred in Qingshuihe Subdistrict, Luohu District, Shenzhen City, Guangdong Province, People's Republic of China on August 5, 1993. It's the second largest chemical explosion accident since the end of World War II.

== Incident ==
The first explosion occurred from an ammonium nitrate warehouse at 13:30, August 5, 1993, and it finally became a big fire. Smoke was visible as far away as Lok Ma Chau, Hong Kong.
