= Julia Ironworks Cassino =

Historical residential building in Bytom, Poland

Coordinates: 50°20′17″N 18°51′56″E

- German: Kasino der Julienhütte; Polish: Kasyno Hutnicze Huty Julia
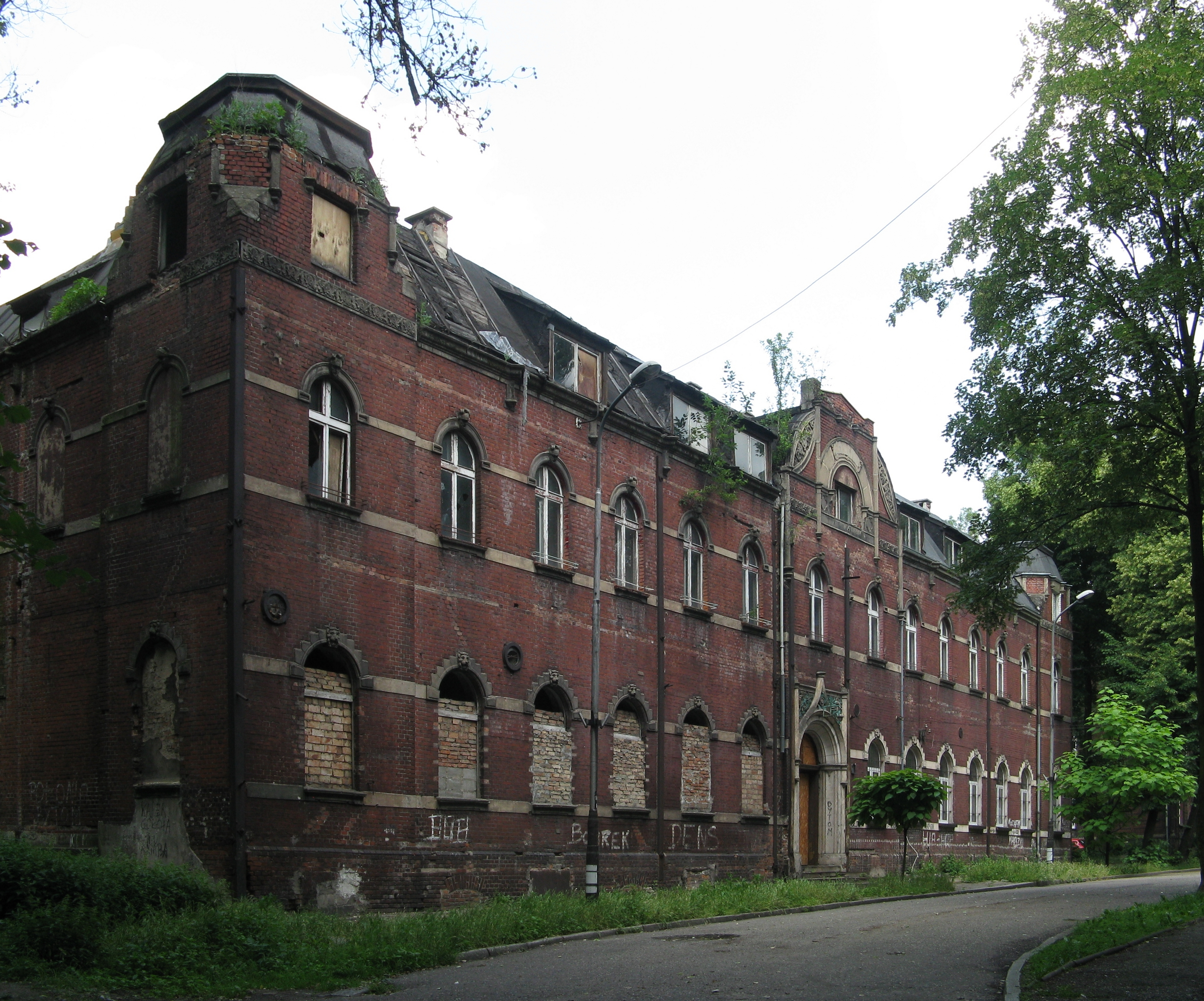
- The building in June, 2018.
- Interactive map of the Julia Ironworks Cassino area

General information
- Location: ul. Huty Julia 10, Bytom (Bobrek), Poland
- Renovated: 1957
- Closed: 2022
- Demolished: 2023

Julia Ironworks Cassino was a historic residential building situated in Bytom-Bobrek, Poland.

Initially serving as a casino of the adjacent steel mill, the building was repurposed to house the families of workers in the 1950s. In June 2023 the building was set afire and the structure was subsequently demolished.

== History ==
The building initially served as a casino of the Julia Steel Mill in Bobrek—Kasino der Julienhütte, being situated on Carostraße. In 1957, several of the steel mill's structures were rehabilitated, including the former casino, being turned into residential housing to accommodate 86 families of mill workers.

By 2010, a clinic operated on the premises. In 2018 the Polish architecture and engineering firm Lechprojekt carried out an assessment of the technical condition of the building in collaboration with ABM Nieruchomości on behalf of the municipality of Bytom. The aim of the assessment was to evaluate a potential restoration and reconstruction of the structure. Ultimately, by March 2022, the municipality closed and secured the building through its housing authority Mieszkania Bytomskie. Subsequently, residents were resettled, and on March 14, 2022, the non-profit organization Stowarzyszenie Dogma, along with a local office of the Municipal Family Assistance Center in Bytom, relocated from the building.

On June 4, 2023, at around midnight, a fire broke out at the site, engulfing the abandoned structure's roof. The Bytom Municipal State Fire Service responded, deploying 65 firefighters who battled the blaze from outside due to the building's deteriorated condition. At 2:34 AM the source of the fire was located and the blaze was extinguished within a few hours. During the operation the building's roof was partially dismantled. While no one was found at the scene, the cause of the fire was determined to be an act of arson. That same year, the building was demolished.

== Gallery ==
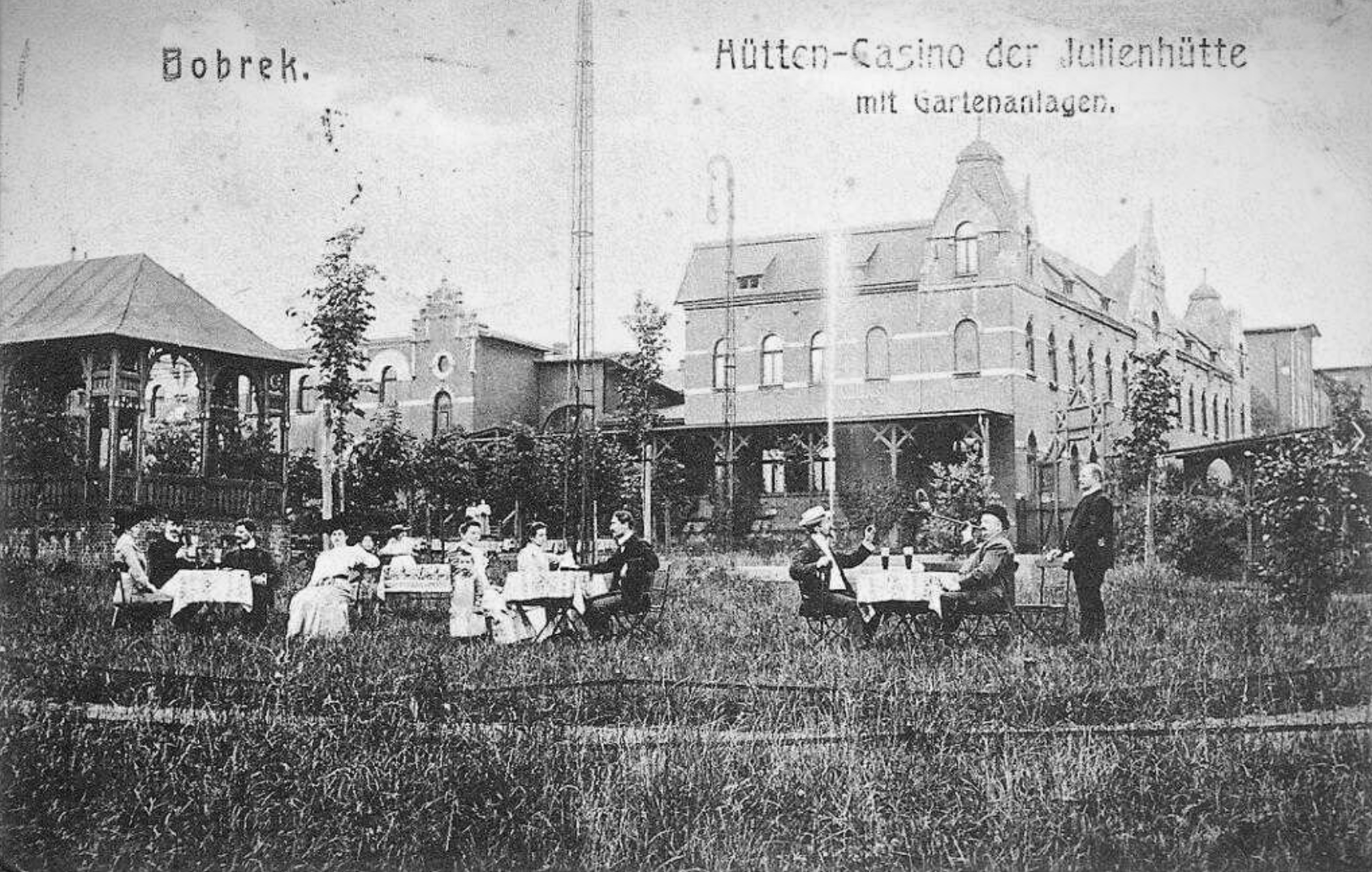
The casino and its garden, 1906.

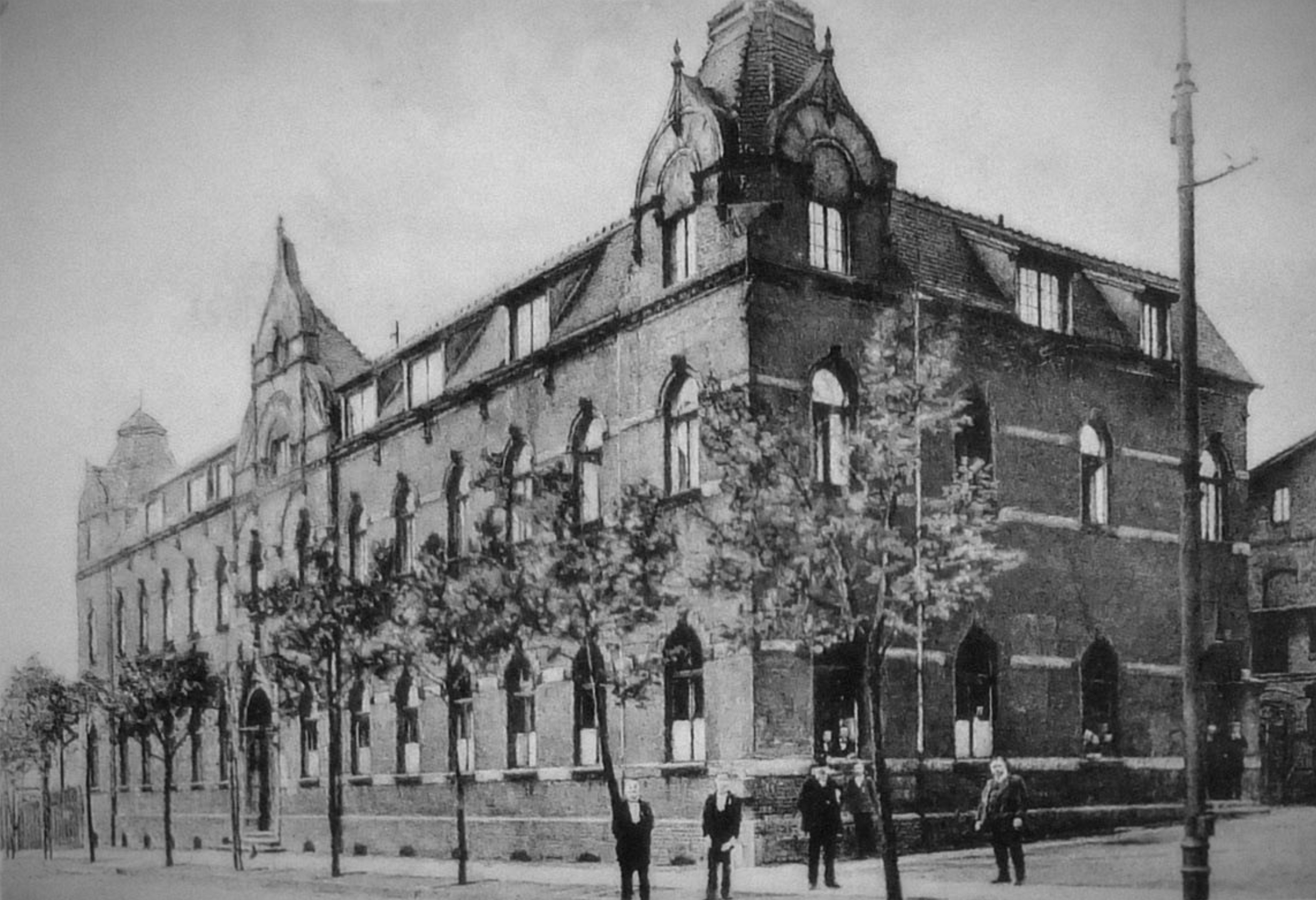
The casino of the Julia Steel Mill, 1910s.
