= 2023 Karachi mall fire =

Shopping centre disaster in Pakistan

2023 RJ Mall fire
- Video still showing the building on fire
- Location of the RJ Shopping Mall in Karachi
- Date: 25 November 2023
- Venue: RJ Shopping Mall
- Location: Karachi, Pakistan; 24.902686°N 67.114452°E
- Cause: Short circuit
- Deaths: At least 11
- Injuries: 35
- Property damage: unknown

On 25 November 2023, an electrical fire broke out in a shopping mall in Karachi, Pakistan, killing at least 11 people, and injuring 35.

== Fire ==
On the morning of 25 November 2023, a short-circuited generator caused a fire on the fourth floor of the RJ shopping mall in Karachi, which at the time held more than 60 people. The fire quickly spread, forcing the entire building to be evacuated and causing extensive property damage.

== Casualties ==
At least 11 people died and 35 were injured. The injured were immediately sent to nearby hospitals for treatment.

== Response ==
Emergency services were immediately dispatched to the scene to control the fire and rescue people trapped inside the mall. The firefighting operation was extensive, involving multiple firefighters and emergency personnel. The area was sealed off for investigation.

== Reactions ==
Speaker of the National Assembly Raja Pervez Ashraf expressed sorrow and regret over the incident.
