= Minister of Health (Iraq) =

The Minister of Health is an official within the Government of Iraq responsible for protecting and promoting public health and providing welfare through direct supervision of Ministry of Health As of 2010–2015, the current minister is Dr. Majeed Hamad Ameen.

On August 11, 2016, Adela Humood Alaboudi, the minister of health, resigned after a hospital fire killed 12 newborn babies and injured 29 women in Baghdad at Yarmouk Hospital. She also fired the hospital director. The fire was set deliberately by eight people who stole millions of dinars.
