= 2013 Moscow psychiatric hospital fire =

Hospital fire in Moscow, Russia

2013 Moscow Psychiatric Hospital Fire
- Date: April 26, 2013
- Time: 2:30 Moscow Time (22:30 UTC)
- Location: Moscow Oblast, Russia; 56°34′22″N 37°13′26″E
- Also known as: April 2013 Russian Hospital fire
- Cause: unknown, may have been caused by a patient
- Deaths: 38
- Injuries: 3

The 2013 Moscow psychiatric hospital fire occurred on 26 April 2013 at 2:30 am Moscow Time (22:30 UTC). At least 38 people were killed, included 36 patients and two doctors after fires tore through a psychiatric hospital outside Moscow in the village of Ramensky, 70 miles north of Moscow in Moscow Oblast on April 26, 2013. 29 people were burned alive, killing some patients in their beds and others who were trapped by barred windows. Only 3 people survived, including 2 patients and a nurse.

== Fire ==
On April 26, 2013, at 2:30 Moscow Time (22:30 UTC), a fire erupted in a psychiatric hospital located in Ramensky, a village in the Dmitrovsky District of Moscow Oblast in European Russia. The facility, which is situated approximately 70 miles north of Moscow, was a two-story building where the fire started in a patient's bed on the second floor. Three doctors and one nurse who rushed to assist the patient were burned alive immediately. The blaze quickly spread throughout the second floor, killing all its occupants. Six minutes after the fire began, the second floor collapsed onto the ground floor, killing patients on the lower level. The fire services arrived on the scene four minutes later and battled the blaze for the next three hours until it was finally extinguished. In the aftermath, the firefighters searched for survivors but were only able to rescue three injured individuals - a nurse on the first floor and two patients on the ground floor.
