= Little, Kentucky =

Unincorporated community in Kentucky, United States

Little
- Unincorporated community
- Location within the state of Kentucky Little (the United States)
- Coordinates: 37°26′23″N 83°21′43″W
- Country: United States
- State: Kentucky
- County: Breathitt
- Elevation: 774 ft (236 m)
- Time zone: UTC-6 (Central (CST))
  - Summer (DST): UTC-5 (CST)
- ZIP codes: 41346
- GNIS feature ID: 508475

Little is an unincorporated community in Breathitt County, Kentucky, United States. Its post office closed in 1995.

The community has the name of the local Little family.
