= York Hotel Fire =

1970 fire in the UK

- Date: 22 December 1970
- Location: York Hotel
- Theme: Fire
- Deaths: 4

On the night of 22 December 1970, a fire broke out inside the York Hotel on Coatham Road in Redcar, North Yorkshire, England. The fire killed four people inside the building. Guests on the upper floors had to use knotted blankets to escape, and at the height of the blaze, over 40 firefighters were in attendance.
