= List of people of the Three Kingdoms (H) =

The following is a partial list of people significant to the Three Kingdoms period (220–280) of Chinese history. Their romanised names start with the letter H.

== H ==
Name	Courtesy name	Birth year	Death year	Ancestral home (present-day location)	Role	Allegiance	Previous allegiance(s)	Notes
Han Bang 韓邦	Changxiu 長休			Nanyang County, Duyang (Fangcheng County, Henan)	Politician	Jin dynasty		
Han Bian 韓扁					General	Eastern Wu		
Han Bin 韓斌					Politician	Han dynasty		
Han Chun 韓純				Duyang, Nanyang (East of Fangcheng County, Henan)	Politician	Han dynasty		
Han Dang 韓當	Yigong 義公		227	Lingzhi, Liaoxi (Qian'an, Hebei)	General	Sun Quan		Sanguozhi vol. 55.
Han Fan 韓範					Politician	Cao Wei	Yuan Shao, Yuan Shang	
Han Fu 韓馥	Wenjie 文節		191	Yingchuan (Yuzhou City, Henan)	Politician, warlord	Han Fu	Han dynasty	
Han Guan 韓觀				Guangyang County, Ji (Beijing)	Politician	Cao Wei		
Han Hao 韓浩	Yuansi 元嗣			Henei (Jiaozuo, Henan)	General	Cao Cao	Wang Kuang	Sanguozhi vol. 9.
Han Heng 韓珩	Zipei 子佩			Dai County (Yanggao, Shanxi)	Politician	Yuan Shao		
Han Hong 韓洪				Nanyang County, Duyang (Fangcheng County, Henan)	Politician	Jin dynasty		
Han Ji 韓暨	Gongzhi 公至		238	Duyang, Nanyang (East of Fangcheng County, Henan)	Politician	Cao Wei	Liu Biao	
Han Juzi 韓莒子			200		General	Yuan Shao		Sanguozhi vol. 1.
Han Kui 韓悝			189		Eunuch	Han dynasty		
Han Long 韓龍					General	Cao Wei		
Han Meng 韓猛/韓荀					General	Yuan Shao		
Han Qi 韓起					General	Gongsun Yuan		
Han Ran 韓冉			220?		Advisor	Liu Bei		
Han Rong 韓融	Yuanchang 元長			Wuyang (Wuyang County, Henan)	General	Han dynasty		
Han Rong 韓榮				Henei (Jiaozuo, Henan)	General	Cao Wei		
Han Shixiong 韓世雄					Fangshi			
Han Shiyuan 韓士元						Shu Han		
Han Shu 韓術				Duyang, Nanyang (East of Fangcheng County, Henan)	Politician	Han dynasty		
Han Song 韓嵩	Degao 德高			Yiyang (Tongbai County, Henan)	Advisor, politician	Cao Cao	Liu Biao	
Han Sui 韓遂	Wenyue 文約		215	Jincheng (around Lanzhou, Gansu and Xining, Qinghai)	General, warlord	Han Sui	Han dynasty	Houhanshu vol. 72; Sanguozhi vol. 1, 6.
Han Xi 韓晞				Nanyang (Nanyang, Henan)	General	Liu Biao		
Han Xian 韓暹			197		Bandit leader, general	Lü Bu	Yellow Turban rebels, Han dynasty, Yuan Shu	Houhanshu vol. 72; Sanguozhi vol. 6.
Han Xuan 韓玄					Politician, warlord	Liu Bei	Han dynasty, Han Xuan	
Han Xuan 韓宣	Jingran 景然			Bohai County (Nanpi County, Hebei)	Advisor, politician	Cao Wei		
Han Yan 韓儼				Langzhong, Baxi (Langzhong, Sichuan)		Shu Han		
Han Yan 韓晏					General	Sun Ce		
Han Yao 韓繇				Nanyang (Nanyang, Henan)	Politician	Cao Wei		
Han Yin 韓胤			197		Advisor	Yuan Shu		
Han Zhao 韓肇				Duyang, Nanyang (East of Fangcheng County, Henan)	Politician	Cao Wei		
Han Zhong 韓忠			184		General	Yellow Turban rebels		Houhanshu vol. 8, 71.
Han Zhong 韓忠		170			General	Gongsun Kang		
Han Zizhu 韓子助				Chenliu County (Kaifeng, Henan)	Politician	Han dynasty		
Han Zong 韓綜			252	Lingzhi, Liaoxi (Qian'an, Hebei)	General	Cao Wei	Eastern Wu	
Han Zong 韓宗					Scholar	Han dynasty		
Handan Chun 邯鄲淳	Zishu 子叔	132	221	Yingchuan (Yuzhou City, Henan)	Calligrapher, scholar, politician	Cao Wei		
Handan Shang 邯鄲商			209	Chenliu County (Chenliu, Henan)	Politician	Han dynasty		
Hao Guang 郝光					Politician	Cao Wei		
Hao Kai 郝凱				Taiyuan County (Taiyuan, Shanxi)		Cao Wei		
Hao Meng 郝萌			196	Henei (Southwest of Wuzhi County, Henan)	General	Lü Bu		Yingxiong Ji annotation in Sanguozhi vol. 7.
Hao Pu 郝普	Daokuang 道匡			Xiangcheng County, Taiyuan (Xiangcheng County, Henan)	Officer	Cao Wei		
Hao Pu 郝普	Zitai 子太		230	Yiyang County (Zaoyang, Hubei)	General	Eastern Wu	Liu Bei	Sanguozhi vol. 54.
Hao Wen 郝溫				Dai County (Yanggao, Shanxi)		Han dynasty		
Hao Xiang 浩詳				Dongpingguo (Dongping County, Shandong)	Astrologer	Cao Wei		
Hao Zhao 郝昭	Bodao 伯道			Taiyuan County (Taiyuan, Shanxi)	General	Cao Wei		
Hao Zhou 浩周	Kongyi 孔異			Shangdang County (Changzhi, Shanxi)	General, politician	Cao Wei	Eastern Wu	
Empress He 何皇后		150	189	Wan County, Nanyang (Nanyang, Henan)	Empress, empress dowager	Han dynasty		Houhanshu vol. 10.
Empress Dowager He 何太后				Jurong, Danyang (Jurong, Jiangsu)	Empress dowager	Eastern Wu		Sanguozhi vol. 50.
He Da 賀達			233	Shanyin, Kuaiji (Southeast of Shaoxing, Zhejiang)	General	Eastern Wu		
He Dian 何典					Rebel leader, general	Guo Ma	Eastern Wu	
He Ding 何定			272	Runan County (Pingyu County, Henan)	General	Eastern Wu		
He Du 何都				Danyang County, Jurong (Jurong, Jiangsu)		Eastern Wu		
He Fu 賀輔				Kuaiji, Shanyin (Shaoxing, Zhejiang)	Politician	Han dynasty		
He Guan 何觀	Juzhong 巨忠			Pi County(Pi County, Sichuan)	Politician	Jin dynasty	Shu Han	Huayang Guo Zhi vol. 11. 06.
He Heng 何衡				Chenguo, Yangxia (Taikang County, Henan)	Politician	Han dynasty		
He Hong 何洪				Danyang County, Jurong (Jurong, Jiangsu)	Politician	Eastern Wu		
He Hui 賀惠				Kuaiji, Shanyin (Shaoxing, Zhejiang)	Politician	Eastern Wu		
He Jiang 何蔣				Danyang County, Jurong (Jurong, Jiangsu)	Politician	Eastern Wu		
He Jiao 和嶠	Changyu 長輿		292	Runan, Xiping (Xiping, Henan)	Politician	Jin dynasty		
He Jin 何進	Suigao 遂高		189	Wan County, Nanyang (Nanyang, Henan)	General, regent	Han dynasty		Houhanshu vol. 69.
He Jing 賀景				Shanyin, Kuaiji (Southeast of Shaoxing, Zhejiang)	General	Eastern Wu		
He Kan 何龕				Junqian (Huoshan County, Anhui)	General	Jin dynasty		
He Kui 何夔	Shulong 叔龍			Yangxia, Chen (Northeast of Taikang, Henan)	Politician	Cao Wei		Sanguozhi vol. 12.
He Li 和離				Xiping, Runan (Xiping County, Henan)	Politician	Cao Wei		
He Luan 和鸞				Zhangye County (Zhangye, Gansu)	Rebel leader		Han dynasty	
He Man 何曼					General	Yellow Turban rebels		Sanguozhi vol. 1.
He Mao 何茂					General	Cao Wei	Yuan Shao	
He Miao 何苗			189	Wan County, Nanyang (Nanyang, Henan)	General	Han dynasty		
He Miao 何邈				Danyang County, Jurong (Jurong, Jiangsu)	General	Eastern Wu		
He Pan 何攀	Huixing 惠興	244	301	Shu County, Pi (Pi County, Chengdu, Sichuan)	Advisor, politician	Jin dynasty	Shu Han	Huayang Guo Zhi vol. 11. 14.
He Qi 賀齊	Gongmiao 公苗		227	Shanyin, Kuaiji (Southeast of Shaoxing, Zhejiang)	General	Sun Quan		Sanguozhi vol. 60.
He Qia 和洽	Yangshi 陽士			Xiping, Runan (Xiping County, Henan)	Politician	Cao Wei	Liu Biao	Sanguozhi vol. 23.
He Shao 賀邵	Xingbo 興伯	226	275	Shanyin, Kuaiji (Southeast of Shaoxing, Zhejiang)	Politician	Eastern Wu		
He Shao 何劭	Jingzu 敬祖		301	Yangxia, Chen (Northeast of Taikang, Henan)	Politician	Jin dynasty		
He Shuang 何雙	Han'ou 漢偶			Pi County, Shu (Pidu District, Chengdu, Sichuan)	Politician	Shu Han		
He Sui 何遂				Danyang County, Jurong (Jurong, Jiangsu)	General	Eastern Wu		
He Sui 何隨	Jiye 季業	214	284	Pi County(Pi County, Sichuan)	Politician	Jin dynasty	Shu Han	Huayang Guo Zhi vol. 11. 06.
He Xiong 何雄					General	Han dynasty		
He Yan 何晏	Pingshu 平叔		249	Wan, Nanyang (Nanyang, Henan)	Politician, xuanxue scholar	Cao Wei		
He Yi 何儀					General	Yellow Turban rebels		Sanguozhi vol. 1, 17.
He Yong 何顒	Boqiu 伯求			Xiangxiang, Yuzhou (Zaoyang, Hubei)	Politician	Yuan Shao	Han dynasty	Houhanshu vol. 67.
He You 和逌				Runan, Xiping (Xiping, Henan)	Politician	Cao Wei		
He Yu 和郁				Runan, Xiping (Xiping, Henan)	Politician	Jin dynasty		
He Yun 何惲				Lujiang County, Qian (Huoshan County, Anhui)	Politician	Jin dynasty		
He Zeng 何曾	Yingkao 穎考	199	278	Yangxia, Chen (Northeast of Taikang, Henan)	Politician	Jin dynasty	Cao Wei	
He Zhen 何楨	Yuangan 元干			Lujiang County, Qian (Huoshan County, Anhui)	Politician, scholar	Jin dynasty	Cao Wei	
He Zhi 何植				Danyang (Xuancheng, Anhui)	Politician	Eastern Wu		
He Zhi 何祗	Junsu 君肅			Shu County (Chengdu, Sichuan)	General, politician	Shu Han		
He Zhi 賀質				Kuaiji, Shanyin (Shaoxing, Zhejiang)	General	Eastern Wu		
He Zong 何宗	Yanying 彦英			Pi County, Shu (Pidu District, Chengdu, Sichuan)	Politician, scholar	Shu Han	Liu Zhang	
He Zun 何遵	Sizu 思祖			Yangxia, Chen (Northeast of Taikang, Henan)	General	Jin dynasty		
Helian 和連					Tribal leader	Xianbei		
Hong Jin 洪進					Rebel leader	Eastern Wu		
Hong Ming 洪明			203		Rebel leader			
Hong Qiu 弘璆				Wu County, Qu'a (Danyang, Jiangsu)	General, politician	Eastern Wu		
Hong Zi 弘咨				Wu County, Qu'a (Danyang, Jiangsu)	Politician	Eastern Wu		
Lady Hou 侯氏		158			Gongsun Zan's wife	Gongsun Zan		
Hou Cheng 侯成					General	Cao Cao	Lü Bu	Houhanshu vol. 75; Jiuzhou Chunqiu annotation in Sanguozhi vol. 7.
Houdanbo 侯彈勃					Tribal leader	Jin dynasty	Tufa Shujineng	Jin Shu vol. 38.
Houjinduo 侯金多					Tribal leader	Jin dynasty	Tufa Shujineng	Jin Shu vol. 38.
Hou Lan 侯覽			172	Fangdong, Shanyang (Shan County, Shandong)	Eunuch	Han dynasty		
Hou Sheng 侯聲					Politician	Cao Cao		
Hou Wuyang 侯武陽				Hedong County (Xia County, Shanxi)				
Hou Xie 侯諧					Politician	Lü Bu		
Hou Xuan 侯選				Hedong (in Shanxi)	General	Cao Cao	Guanzhong coalition, Zhang Lu	Sanguozhi vol. 1, 36.
Hou Yin 侯音			219		Rebel leader, general		Cao Cao	Sanguozhi vol. 1.
Houshi Guang 侯史光	Xiaoming 孝明			Yi, Donglai (Yantai, Shandong)	Politician	Jin dynasty	Cao Wei	
Lady Hu 胡氏					Liu Yan (Shu Han)'s wife	Shu Han		
Hu Bo 胡博				Lujiang County, Yiyang (Tongbai County, Henan)	Politician	Shu Han		
Hu Cai 胡才					General	Han dynasty		
Hu Che’er 胡車兒					General	Zhang Xiu		Sanguozhi vol. 8.
Hu Chi’er 胡赤兒					General	Niu Fu		Sanguozhi vol. 6.
Hu Chong 胡沖				Gushi, Runan (Gushi County, Henan)	Advisor, politician	Jin dynasty	Eastern Wu	
Hu Fen 胡奮	Xuanwei 玄威		288	Linjing County, Anding (Southeast of Zhenyuan County, Gansu)	General	Jin dynasty	Cao Wei	
Hu Feng 胡封			198	Beidi (Lingwu, Ningxia)	General	Dong Zhuo		
Hu Guang 胡廣	Xuanzu 宣祖			Anding County, Linjing (Zhenyuan, Gansu)	Politician	Jin dynasty		
Hu Ji 胡濟	Weidu 偉度			Yiyang (Xinyang, Henan)	General	Shu Han		
Hu Ji 胡濟					General	Shu Han		
Hu Kang 胡伉					Politician	Eastern Wu		
Hu Kang 胡康				Qiao County, Pei (Bozhou, Anhui)		Cao Wei		
Hu Lei 扈累	Bochong 伯重			Jingzhaoyin (Xi'an, Shaanxi)	Astronomer, scholar	Han dynasty		
Hu Lie 胡烈	Xuanwu 玄武		270	Linjing County, Anding (Southeast of Zhenyuan County, Gansu)	General	Jin dynasty	Cao Wei	
Hu Liu 護留					Tribal leader	Wuhuan, Cao Wei	Yuan Shao, Yuan Shang	
Hu Mao 扈瑁				Yingchuan County (Yuzhou, Henan)	Politician	Han dynasty		
Hu Miao 胡邈	Jingcai 敬才			Anding County, Linjing (Zhenyuan County, Gansu)	Politician	Li Jue	Han dynasty	
Hu Min 胡敏	Tongda 通達			Jiujiang County, Shouchun (Shou County, Anhui)		Han dynasty		
Hu Pi 胡羆	Jixiang 季象			Huainan County, Shouchun (Shou County, Anhui)	General	Jin dynasty		
Hu Qi 胡岐	Xuanyi 玄嶷			Bingzhou (Taiyuan, Shanxi)	Politician	Jin dynasty		
Hu Qian 胡潛	Gongxing 公興			Wei County (Linzhang County, Hebei)	Scholar	Shu Han		Sanguozhi vol. 42.
Hu Shou 壺壽					Politician	Han dynasty		
Hu Wei 胡威	Bohu 伯虎		280	Huainan County, Shouchun (Shou County, Anhui)	General, politician	Jin dynasty	Cao Wei	
Hu Wei 胡衛					Politician	Eastern Wu		
Hu Wencai 胡文才						Han dynasty		Could possibly be Hu Zhen
Hu Xiong 胡熊					General	Jin dynasty		
Hu Ye 胡業				Nanyang County (Nanyang, Henan)	Politician	Cao Wei		
Hu Yi 胡奕	Cisun 次孫			Jiujiang County, Shouchun (Shou County, Anhui)	General	Jin dynasty		
Hu Yuan 胡淵	Shiyuan 世元	247	301	Linjing County, Anding (Southeast of Zhenyuan County, Gansu)	General	Jin dynasty	Cao Wei	
Hu Zhao 胡昭	Kongming 孔明	162	250	Yingchuan (Yuzhou City, Henan)	Calligrapher, scholar			
Hu Zhen 胡軫	Wencai ? 文才 ?				General	Li Jue	Dong Zhuo	Houhanshu vol. 72; Sanguozhi vol. 46.
Hu Zhen 胡軫					General	Cao Wei		
Hu Zhi 胡質	Wende 文德		250	Shouchun, Huainan (Shou County, Anhui)	Politician	Cao Wei		Sanguozhi vol. 27.
Hu Zhi 扈質					General	Cao Cao		
Hu Zhong 狐忠					General	Shu Han		Possibly the same person as Ma Zhong
Hu Zong 胡綜	Weize 偉則	185	243	Gushi, Runan (Gushi County, Henan)	Politician	Eastern Wu		
Hu Zuan 胡纂				Yingchuan (Yuzhou City, Henan)	Politician	Jin dynasty	Cao Wei	
Hu Zun 胡遵			256	Linjing County, Anding (Southeast of Zhenyuan County, Gansu)	General	Cao Wei		
Hua Biao 華表	Weirong 偉容	204	275	Gaotang, Pingyuan (Southwest of Yucheng City, Shandong)	Politician	Jin dynasty	Cao Wei	Jin Shu vol. 44.
Hua Bo 華博				Gaotang, Pingyuan (Yucheng, Shandong)	Politician	Cao Wei		
Hua Dan 華澹	Xuanjun 玄駿			Gaotang, Pingyuan (Yucheng, Shandong)	Politician	Jin dynasty		
Hua Dang 華當					General	Eastern Wu		
Hua He 華覈	Yongxian 永先			Wujin, Wu	Politician	Eastern Wu		Sanguozhi vol. 65.
Hua Ji 華緝				Pingyuan County, Gaotang (Yucheng, Shandong)	Politician	Cao Wei		
Hua Jiao 華嶠	Shujun 叔駿		293	Gaotang, Pingyuan (Yucheng, Shandong)	General, politician, writer	Jin dynasty	Cao Wei	
Hua Qi 華錡					Advisor	Eastern Wu		
Hua Rong 華融	Derui 德蕤		256	Guangling County, Jiangdu (Yangzhou, Jiangsu)	General	Eastern Wu		
Hua Tuo 華佗	Yuanhua 元化	140	208	Qiao County, Pei (Bozhou, Anhui)	Fangshi, physician			Sanguozhi vol. 29.
Hua Xin 華歆	Ziyu 子魚	157	232	Gaotang, Pingyuan (Southwest of Yucheng City, Shandong)	Politician	Cao Wei	Liu Yao, Sun Ce, Sun Quan	Sanguozhi vol. 13.
Hua Xiong 華雄			191		General	Dong Zhuo		Sanguozhi vol. 46.
Hua Xu 華諝			256	Guangling County, Jiangdu (Yangzhou, Jiangsu)	General	Eastern Wu		
Hua Yan 華彦					Politician	Yuan Shao		
Hua Yi 華廙	Changjun 長駿			Gaotang, Pingyuan (Yucheng, Shandong)	General, politician, writer	Jin dynasty	Cao Wei	
Hua Zhou 華周				Gaotang, Pingyuan (Yucheng, Shandong)	Politician	Cao Wei		
Huai Xu 懷敘					Politician	Eastern Wu		
Huan Dian 桓典	Gong Ya 公雅		201	Longkang, Pei (North of Longkang Town, Huaiyuan County, Anhui)	Politician	Han dynasty		Houhanshu vol. 37.
Huan Fa 桓發				Jiaozhi (Hanoi, Vietnam)	General	Eastern Wu		
Huan Fan 桓範	Yuanze 元則		249	Longkang, Pei (North of Longkang Town, Huaiyuan County, Anhui)	Advisor, politician	Cao Wei		Sanguozhi vol. 9.
Huan Jia 桓嘉			252	Linxiang, Changsha (Changsha, Hunan)	Politician	Cao Wei		
Huan Jie 桓階	Boxu 伯緒			Linxiang, Changsha (Changsha, Hunan)	Politician	Cao Wei	Sun Jian, Liu Biao, Zhang Xian	Sanguozhi vol. 22.
Huan Lin 桓鄰			227	Jiaozhi (Hanoi, Vietnam)	Politician	Shi Xie		
Huan Ling 桓陵	Yuanhui 元徽			Linxiang, Changsha (Changsha, Hunan)	Politician	Jin dynasty		
Huan Lü 桓慮					Politician	Eastern Wu		
Huan Shao 桓邵				Peiguo (Suixi, Anhui)		Han dynasty		
Huan Sheng 桓勝				Linxiang, Changsha (Changsha, Hunan)	Politician	Han dynasty		
Huan Wei 桓威				Xiapi (Pizhou, Jiangsu)	Politician	Cao Wei		
Huan Yan 桓嚴	Wenlin 文林			Longkang, Pei (North of Longkang Town, Huaiyuan County, Anhui)Anhui)	Politician	Han dynasty		Houhanshu vol. 37.
Huan Yi 桓翊				Linxiang, Changsha (Changsha, Hunan)	Politician	Cao Wei		
Huan Yi 桓彝					Politician	Eastern Wu		
Huan You 桓祐				Linxiang, Changsha (Changsha, Hunan)		Cao Wei		
Huan Yu 桓禺				Peiguo, Qiao (Bozhou, Anhui)	Politician	Cao Wei		
Huan Yuanjiang 桓元將								
Huan Zhi 桓治				Jiaozhi (Hanoi, Vietnam)	General	Shi Hui	Eastern Wu	
Huan Zuan 桓纂				Linxiang, Changsha (Changsha, Hunan)	General	Cao Wei		
Lady Huang 黃氏				Baishui, Gainan (Xiangyang, Hubei)				Xiangyang Ji annotation in Sanguozhi vol. 35.
Huang Ang 黄昂				Jiuquan County (Jiuquan, Gansu)		Han dynasty		
Huang Bing 黃柄				Quanling, Lingling (North of Lingling District, Hunan)	Politician	Eastern Wu		
Huang Chengyan 黃承彥				Baishui, Gainan (Xiangyang, Hubei)	Scholar			Xiangyang Ji annotation in Sanguozhi vol. 35.
Huang Chong 黃崇			263	Langzhong, Baxi (Langzhong, Sichuan)	General	Shu Han		
Huang Gai 黃蓋	Gongfu 公覆			Quanling, Lingling (North of Lingling District, Hunan)	General	Sun Quan		Sanguozhi vol. 55.
Huang Gai 黃蓋				Nanhai County (Guangzhou, Guangdong)	Politician	Han dynasty		
Huang Hao 黄皓					Eunuch	Shu Han		Sanguozhi vol. 39.
Huang Hua 黃華				Jiuquan, Gansu	General	Cao Wei		
Huang Jiang 黃疆					General	Eastern Wu		
Huang Lang 黃朗	Wenda 文達			Peiguo (Xuzhou, Pei County, Jiangsu)	General, politician	Cao Wei		
Huang Long 黃龍					Rebel leader			
Huang Luan 黃亂				Jian'an (Jian'ou, Fujian)	Tribal leader	Shanyue		
Huang Quan 黃權	Gongheng 公衡		240	Langzhong, Baxi (Langzhong, Sichuan)	General, politician	Cao Wei	Liu Zhang, Shu Han	Sanguozhi vol. 43.
Huang Rang 黃穰				Lujiang (Southwest of Lujiang County, Anhui)	Bandit leader, rebel leader			
Huang Shao 黃邵					General	Yellow Turban rebels		
Huang She 黃射						Liu Biao		Huang Zu's son.
Huang Ta 黃他				Kuaiji, Zhang'an (Linhai, Zhejiang)	Politician	Han dynasty		
Huang Wan 黃琬	Ziyan 子琰	141	192	Anlu, Jingzhou (Anlu, Hubei)	Politician	Dong Zhuo	Han dynasty	Houhanshu vol. 61.
Huang Wu 黃吳					General	Eastern Wu		
Huang Xi 黃襲					General	Shu Han		
Huang Xiang 皇象	Xiuming 休明			Jiangdu, Guangling (Yangzhou, Jiangsu)	Calligrapher, politician	Eastern Wu		
Huang Xiu 黃休					Politician	Cao Wei		
Huang Xu 黃叙				Nanyang (Nanyang, Henan)		Shu Han		
Huang Yi 黃猗						Yuan Shu		
Huang Yong 黃邕				Langzhong, Baxi (Langzhong, Sichuan)	Politician	Cao Wei		
Huang Yuan 黃元					Rebel leader, politician		Shu Han	
Huang Yuan 黃淵					General	Eastern Wu		
Huang Zhen 黃珍				Lai County, Changguang (Laiyang, Shandong)	Politician	Cao Wei		
Huang Zhong 黃忠	Hansheng 漢升		220	Nanyang (Nanyang, Henan)	General	Liu Bei	Liu Biao, Han Xuan	Sanguozhi vol. 36.
Huang Zhu 黃柱				Nanyang (Nanyang, Henan)	Politician	Shu Han		
Huang Zu 黃祖			208		General	Liu Biao		Houhanshu vol. 80; Sanguozhi vol. 46, 47, 55.
Huangfu Jianshou 皇甫堅壽				Chaona, Anding (Southeast of Zhenyuan County, Gansu)	Politician	Han dynasty		Huangfu Song's son
Huangfu Kai 皇甫闓					General	Cao Wei		
Huangfu Li 皇甫酈				Liangzhou (Wuwei, Gansu)	General	Dong Zhuo	Han dynasty	
Huangfu Long 皇甫隆					Politician	Cao Wei		
Huangfu Mi 皇甫謐	Shi'an 士安	215	282	Zhao'na(Zhu'nuo), Anding (Pengyang, Ningxia)	Scholar, physician	Jin dynasty		Jin Shu vol. 51.
Huangfu Song 皇甫嵩	Yizhen 義真		195	Chaona, Anding (Southeast of Zhenyuan County, Gansu)	General	Han dynasty		Houhanshu vol. 71.
Huangfu Tao 皇甫陶					Politician	Jin dynasty		
Huangfu Yan 皇甫晏			272			Jin dynasty		
Huanglong Luo 黃龍羅				Kuaiji, Shanyin (Shaoxing, Yuecheng District, Zhejiang)	Rebel leader			
Huchuquan 呼厨泉					Tribal leader	Xiongnu		
Hui Qu 惠衢				Langya (Linyi, Shandong)	Politician	Yuan Shu		
Humu Ban 胡母班	Jipi 季皮		189	Taishan (Northeast of Tai'an, Shandong)	Politician	Han dynasty		
Humu Biao 胡母彪				Taishan (Northeast of Tai'an, Shandong)		Han dynasty		
Huo Du 霍篤				Zhijiang, Nan (Zhijiang, Hubei)		Liu Biao		
Huo Jun 霍峻	Zhongmiao 仲邈	177	216	Zhijiang, Nan (Zhijiang, Hubei)	General	Liu Bei	Liu Biao	Sanguozhi vol. 41.
Huo Nu 霍奴			205	Zhuo County, Gu'an (Yi County, Hebei)	Rebel leader			
Huo Xing 霍性			220	Xinping County (Bin County, Shaanxi)	General	Cao Wei		
Huo Yi 霍弋	Shaoxian 紹先			Zhijiang, Nan (Zhijiang, Hubei)	General	Cao Wei	Shu Han	Sanguozhi vol. 41.
