= 2024 in China =

- Decades: 2000s; 2010s; 2020s
- See also: Other events of 2024; History of China • Timeline • Years

Events in the year 2024 in China.

== Incumbents ==
- General Secretary of the Chinese Communist Party (paramount leader) – Xi Jinping
- President – Xi Jinping
- Premier - Li Qiang
- Congress chairman – Zhao Leji
- Consultative Conference chairman – Wang Huning
- Vice President - Han Zheng
- Supervision Commission director – Liu Jinguo

== Events ==
=== January ===
- 12 January – 2024 Pingdingshan mining explosion: Ten people are killed and six others are missing after an explosion at a coal mine in Pingdingshan, Henan.
- 20 January – Yingcai Boarding School fire: Thirteen third grade children are killed and another is injured in a boarding school dormitory fire in Dushu, Henan Province. The school's director is arrested.
- 22 January – A landslide in Zhaotong, Yunnan, kills 44 people.
- 23 January – 2024 Uqturpan earthquake: A magnitude 7.1 earthquake strikes Uqturpan County in Xinjiang Province, killing three people, all in Xinjiang, and injuring at least 50 people, the majority of whom are in nearby Kazakhstan. Forty-seven buildings in China collapse, while a further 78 are damaged.
- 24 January – Thirty-nine people are killed and nine others injured during a fire at a commercial building in Yushui, Jiangxi.
- 31 January – Wu Xieyu was executed by lethal injection at the age of 29 for the murder of his mother Xie Tianqin in Fuzhou, Fujian on 10 July 2015.

=== February ===
- 10 February – Ju County attack: An alleged mass murder occurs in Ju County, Shandong, resulting in the deaths of at least 21 people.
- 22 February – 2024 Lixinsha Bridge collapse: Five people are killed when a ship rams the Lixinsha Bridge in Guangzhou.
- 24 February – 2024 Nanjing building fire: A fire at an apartment block in Nanjing kills 15 people.
- 28 February – China urges the world's largest nuclear states to negotiate a 'no-first-use' treaty.

=== March ===
- 11 March – Seven miners are killed and 24 others are injured in an explosion inside a coal mine in Anhui.
- 13 March – Two people are killed and 26 others are injured during an explosion caused by a suspected gas leak at a restaurant in Langfang.
- 19 March – Founder of Chinese property developer Evergrande Group Hui Ka Yan is fined 47 million yuan (US$6.53 million) and barred from the securities market for life after China Securities Regulatory Commission accused the group for inflating its revenue.
- 20 March – Linfen highway accident: A bus crashes into a tunnel wall along the Hohhot–Beihai Expressway in Linfen, Shanxi province, killing 14 people and injuring 37.

=== April ===
- 13 April – Twelve people are killed after a tourist boat sinks near Qinhuangdao, Hebei.
- 22 April – Heavy rain triggers flooding in Guangdong Province, causing around 10 deaths and 110,000 evacuations.
- 27 April – Five people are killed and 140 buildings are damaged after a tornado strikes Guangzhou.

=== May ===
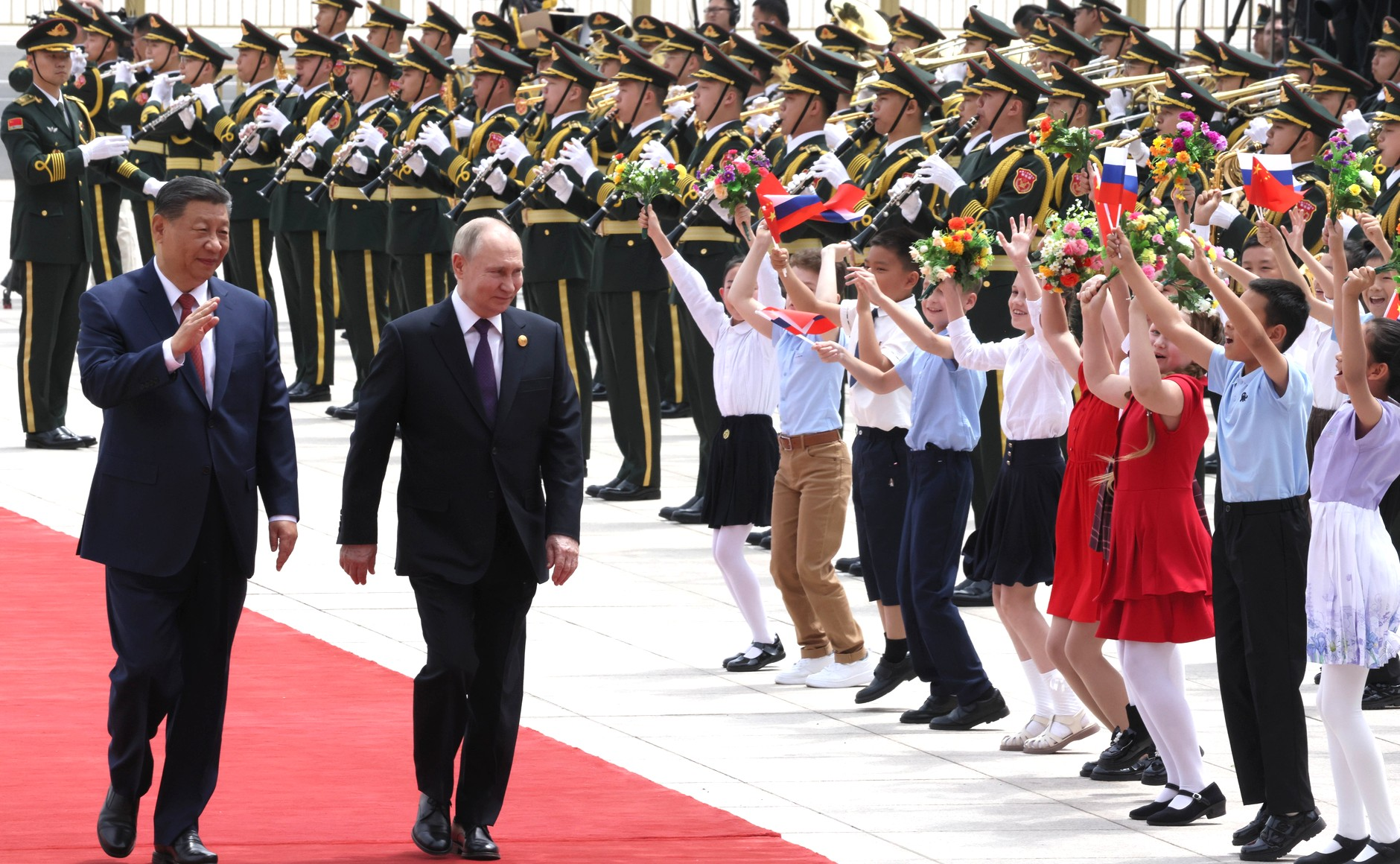
Xi Jinping welcomes Vladimir Putin in Beijing during Putin's visit to China in May 2024

- 1 May – At least 48 people are killed after a mountainside section of highway in Meizhou, Guangdong Province collapses during heavy rains.
- 3 May – China launches the Chang'e 6 spacecraft on a two-month mission to collect lunar rock and soil samples from the far side of the Moon.
- 7 May – Two people are killed and 21 others are injured in a mass stabbing inside a hospital in Zhenxiong, Yunnan Province.
- 9 May – Nine people are killed and two others are injured in collision between a truck and a passenger van near Qingtongxia, Ningxia.
- 14 May – United States President Joe Biden passes tariff increases on Chinese imports, including electric vehicle batteries, computer chips, and medical products.
- 16 May – Russian president Vladimir Putin meets President Xi Jinping in Beijing as part of his two-day visit to China. A joint statement released outlines their countries’ alignment on issues including energy, trade, security, and geopolitics
- 18 May
  - An investigation is opened into Agriculture minister Tang Renjian for suspected corruption-related violations.
  - The Great Wall Marathon returns after a four-year suspension due to the COVID-19 pandemic.
- 20 May – Two people are killed and ten others are injured in a mass stabbing at a primary school in Guixi, Jiangxi Province.
- 22 May – The United Nations Security Council votes against a resolution introduced by Russia and China banning member states from placing weapons in outer space.
- 23 May – One person is killed and three others are injured in a suspected gas explosion inside an apartment in Harbin.
- 24 May – Black Dog, a Chinese film directed by Guan Hu, wins the Un Certain Regard prize for international films at the 2024 Cannes Film Festival.
- 27 May – Four people are killed after an apartment building collapses in Tongling, Anhui.

=== June ===
- 2 June – China's Chang'e 6 lunar exploration mission successfully lands on the far side of the Moon.
- 3 June – The Ministry of State Security foils an espionage plot involving two government employees accused of working for British intelligence.
- 4 June – The Chang'e 6 spacecraft lifts off from the surface of the far side of the Moon carrying samples of lunar soil and rocks back to Earth.
- 10 June – Four American university teachers are injured in a stabbing at a park in Jilin Province.
- 12 June – Three people are reported missing following a helicopter crash in Shangrao, Jiangxi Province.
- 15 June – China issues new regulations allowing the China Coast Guard to detain foreigners accused of entering China's territorial waters and adjacent waters illegally.
- 16–21 June – At least 47 people die after record rains hit parts of Guangdong Province.
- 18 June:
  - At least nine people are killed and 15 are reported missing in landslides caused by floods in the provinces of Guangdong and Fujian. At least 378 houses are destroyed while 880 hectares of land is inundated.
  - Ecuador's foreign ministry announces the reinstatement of visa requirements for travelers from China, citing an increase in irregular migratory flows from the latter.
- 21 June – China officially defines Taiwanese separatist behavior as a criminal act.
- 22 June – Six people are found dead following a landslide in Shanghang County, Fujian.
- 24 June – Three people, including two Japanese nationals, are injured in a stabbing at a bus stop in Suzhou.
- 25 June – The Chang'e 6 lunar exploration mission successfully returns to Earth after taking rock and soil samples from the far side of the moon. The Orbiter proceeded on a mission to carry out observations at Sun-Earth Lagrange point L2 after dropping the sample off to Earth.
- 27 June – Former defence ministers Li Shangfu and Wei Fenghe are expelled from the Chinese Communist Party for "serious violation of party discipline and the law".
- 30 June – The privately owned Tianlong-3 space rocket is destroyed after it is launched by accident from its test site near Gongyi, Henan.

=== July ===
- 2 July –
  - Around 240,000 people are displaced by floods in eastern China.
  - The United States Department of Homeland Security deports 116 Chinese migrants back to China to deter illegal migration across the Mexico–United States border, representing the nation's first "large charter flight" deportation in the past five years.
- 5 July:
  - The European Union imposes tariffs on Chinese electric vehicles ranging up to 37.6%, prompting the Ministry of Commerce to investigate European pork and brandy imports as potential retaliatory tariffs.
  - Five people are killed and 83 others are injured after tornadoes strike Heze, Shandong.
- 8 July – Hungarian prime minister Viktor Orbán makes an unannounced "peace mission" to Beijing to meet with Xi Jinping following a similarly unannounced meeting with Russian president Vladimir Putin in Moscow.
- 10 July – All 32 NATO member states approve an official statement classifying China as a “decisive enabler” of Russia's invasion of Ukraine due to its "no-limits" economic and political partnership with Russia.
- 11 July – Taiwan reports that 66 Chinese military aircraft operated around Taiwanese airspace in a 24-hour period, marking the highest single-day number in 2024 so far.
- 14 July – The navies of Russia and China begin joint military drills in Guangdong four days after China was called a "decisive enabler" of Russia's invasion of Ukraine in a declaration signed by all 32 NATO countries.
- 15 July – Several Palestinian factions, including Fatah and Hamas, schedule reconciliatory meetings in China in an attempt to end their ongoing political disputes.
- 16 July – Chinese businessman Guo Wengui is found guilty by a U.S. jury on multiple fraud charges, accused of running a racketeering enterprise from 2018 to 2023 that defrauded thousands of investors out of over $1 billion.
- 17 July:
  - Sixteen people are killed in a fire at a shopping centre in Zigong, Sichuan.
  - China suspends negotiations between the United States regarding nuclear non-proliferation and arms control, citing American military support for Taiwan.
- 19 July – At least 38 people are killed and 24 are reported missing after a bridge collapses in Shangluo, Shaanxi following flash flooding.
- 21 July – The Philippines announces an agreement with China on resupply missions to the beached naval ship BRP Sierra Madre on Second Thomas Shoal in the South China Sea following an incident in June.
- 23 July – 2024 Beijing Declaration: Various factions in the Palestinian government, including rivals Fatah and Hamas, sign a declaration in Beijing to end their divisions and form a unity government.
- 26 July:
  - The Badain Jaran Desert is designated as a World Heritage Site by UNESCO.
  - China and India agree to cooperate in withdrawing all their troops from their disputed border, with aims of peacefully achieving "complete disengagement" from the border conflict as quickly as possible.
- 27 July – Eight pedestrians are killed and five others are injured after being hit by a car in Changsha. A suspect is arrested.
- 30 July – An agreement is reached between China and Taiwan to repatriate the fatalities of the 2024 Kinmen Chinese motorboat capsizing incident to the mainland.

=== August ===
- 1 August –
  - At least 30 people are killed and 35 others are reported missing following days of flooding caused in part by Typhoon Gaemi in Zixing, Hunan Province.
  - China and India conduct the 30th round of talks in New Delhi, India, to resolve the ongoing border disputes, by agreeing to speed up negotiations over the border disputes and to maintain peace and tranquility in border regions.
- 9 August – Multiple funeral directors are charged with selling 4,000 corpses for decades to two major medical companies that are subsidiaries of a state-owned company. The scandal is censored domestically.
- 19 August –
  - The China Coast Guard claims that two vessels of the Philippine Coast Guard "deliberately collided" with one of its boats in Sabina Shoal in the Spratly Islands.
  - President of Vietnam and General Secretary of the Communist Party of Vietnam Tô Lâm arrives in China for a three-day state visit, his first overseas visit since becoming president and general secretary.
- 22 August – Belarus and China agree to greatly strengthen mutual trade, financial, energy, and security cooperation, which includes enhancing industrial supply chains and collaboration with the Guangdong-Hong Kong-Macau Greater Bay Area.
- 23 August –
  - At least 11 people are killed and 14 others are reported missing following days of flooding caused by heavy rains in Huludao, Liaoning.
  - The United States Treasury Department imposes sanctions on more than 400 individuals and entities, including Chinese firms that are allegedly aiding Russia in order to avoid western sanctions.

=== September ===
- 3 September –
  - A school bus rams into a crowd after its driver loses control over the vehicle outside a school in Tai'an, Shandong Province, killing 11 people and injuring at least 12 others.
  - Artist Gao Zhen is detained for recurring works critical of former leader Mao Zedong.
- 5 September – The government bans the adoption of Chinese children to overseas recipients except for those biologically or legally related to adoptees.
- 6 September – The world's largest indoor skiing resort is opened in Pudong, Shanghai, with a 90,000 square metres (970,000 sq ft) skiing area and a total campus area of 350,000 square metres (3,800,000 sq ft).
- 10 September – The Chinese Football Association issues lifetime bans on 43 players and officials following a two-year investigation into match-fixing, bribery and illegal gambling in domestic games.
- 13 September – The National People's Congress approves the raising of the statutory retirement age starting in 2025.
- 16 September – At least two people are killed after Typhoon Bebinca makes landfall in Shanghai.
- 18 September – A ten-year old student of a Japanese school dies in a knife attack in Shenzhen. The suspect is arrested.
- 25 September –
  - China carries out its first test of an intercontinental ballistic missile since 1980, launching a dummy warhead into the Pacific Ocean that lands near the Marquesas Islands.
  - Ukrainian president Volodymyr Zelenskyy accuses Brazil and China of using their proposed peace plan for ending the Russo–Ukrainian War to boost their geopolitical power "at Ukraine's expense" by urging developing nations to agree to it.
- 26 September – A United States defence official claims that a Chinese nuclear attack submarine, the first of the new Zhou-class, sank during construction likely between May and June.
- 30 September – Three people are killed and 18 others are injured in knife attack at a supermarket in Shanghai. The suspect is arrested.

=== October ===
- 11 October – A National Geographic team announces the discovery in the Rongbuk Glacier of the partial remains of British climber Andrew Irvine, who disappeared while climbing Mount Everest in 1924.
- 21 October – India announces an agreement with China regarding military patrols along the Line of Actual Control between their countries.
- 22 October – The government agrees to extend its 2018 provisional agreement with the Holy See regarding the appointment of Catholic bishops in China until 2028.
- 28 October – Five people are injured in a knife attack in Haidian, Beijing. The suspect is arrested.

=== November ===
- 7 November – Leon Wang, the president of AstraZeneca in China, is arrested following allegations of collection of patient data and the importation of medicines not approved by Chinese authorities.
- 8 November – The government passes a law on energy aimed to promote carbon neutrality.
- 10 November – The foreign ministry issues baselines around Scarborough Shoal that is also claimed by the Philippines.
- 11 November – At least 35 people are killed and 43 others are injured after a man rams an SUV into a crowd exercising at a sports stadium in Zhuhai.
- 16 November – Eight people are killed and 17 others are injured in a a mass stabbing carried out by a former student at the a vocational school in Wuxi.
- 19 November – An unspecified number of casualties are reported after a car rams into a crowd outside a school in Dingcheng District, Hunan.
- 27 November – Three American nationals imprisoned in China are released and returned to the US as part of a prisoner exchange in return for the release of at least one Chinese national detained in the US.
- 28 November – Miao Hua, an admiral and concurrent member of the Central Military Commission, is suspended from his latter position as part of an investigation into suspected corruption.
- 29 November – Dong Yuyu, a journalist working for Guangming Daily, is sentenced to seven years' imprisonment for espionage.

=== December ===
- 3 December – The Ministry of Commerce imposes a ban on the export of gallium, germanium, antimony and other materials with potential military applications to the United States in retaliation for export controls imposed by Washington on semiconductor-related items.
- 4 December – A section for the Shenzhen–Zhanjiang high-speed railway that is under construction collapses in Shenzhen, leaving 13 workers missing.
- 10 December – Former Evergrande Group chair Tang Shuangning is convicted by a court in Taiyuan of embezzlement and bribery and is sentenced to 12 years' imprisonment.
- 13 December – Former China national football team coach Li Tie is convicted of match-fixing and bribery and is sentenced to 20 years' imprisonment.

== Holidays ==
- 1 January – New Year's Day
- 10–17 February – Chinese New Year
- 4–6 April – Tomb-Sweeping Day
- 1 May – Labor Day
- 10 June – Dragon Boat Festival
- 15–17 September – Mid-Autumn Festival
- 1–7 October – National Day

== Art and entertainment ==
- List of Chinese submissions for the Academy Award for Best International Feature Film
- 2024 in Chinese music

== Deaths ==
- 10 January – Tian Zengpei, 93, diplomat and politician, ambassador to Yugoslavia (1986–1988) and chairperson of the committee of Foreign Affairs (1998–2003).
- 11 January – Zhang Kehui, 95, politician, vice chairman of the CPPCC (1998–2008).
- 12 January – Francis F. Lee, 96, Chinese-American inventor, businessman and academic.
- 24 January – Dai Yi, 97, historian.
- 29 June – Shi Ping, 112, academic, political, and supercentenarian.
- 4 August – Tsung-Dao Lee, 97, Chinese-American physicist, Nobel Prize laureate (1957).

== See also ==
- Timeline of Chinese history
- Years in China
