= Living in a Tree =

2020 education controversy in China

- by A Zhejiang college entrance examination candidate
- Original title: 生活在树上
- First published in: July 7, 2020
- Country: China
- Language: Chinese
- Subject(s): The candidate's reflection on the relationship between the individual and the family and society
- Genre: Argumentative prose
- Publisher: Zhejiang Teaching Monthly WeChat official account
- Publication date: July 7, 2020
- Published in English: July 7, 2020

"Living in a Tree" (simplified Chinese: 生活在树上; traditional Chinese: 生活在樹上; pinyin: Shēnghuó zài shù shàng) was an essay question as part of the national unified examination for the enrollment of ordinary higher education institutions in the People's Republic of China in July 2020. A test room essay created by a candidate in Zhejiang Province during a Chinese language exam. The article extensively cites famous quotes and words. In the evaluation of college entrance examination essays. The first examiner gave a score of 39, while the second and third examiners gave a score of 55. After final review, this article received a full score of 60.

This article became popular after it was published on the WeChat official account of a journal editing group hosted by Zhejiang International Studies University Zhejiang Teaching Monthly, and some netizens adapted and "translated" this article with a comment from the leader of the grading team, Chen Jianxin (Note: Chen is also an associate professor from Zhejiang University.), through their official WeChat account on August 2, 2020. but the WeChat post was soon deleted. At the same time, it also sparked a public opinion controversy, with different opinions from scholars and endless debates among netizens.

One side believes that the actual content of the article is hollow, lacks thematic ideas, and is confusing and incomprehensible, with the suspicion of piling up concepts. The other side believes that the article goes beyond the understanding of ordinary high school students, with elegant wording, profound content, and a memorable meaning, reflecting the profoundness and profundity of Chinese culture. The exploration of this article also extends to the direction of Chinese composition in the college entrance examination and the Chinese language system in the college entrance examination. Later, some netizens questioned the existence of interest transfer in the grading process and reported Chen Jianxin, who had served as the leader of the Zhejiang Provincial College Entrance Examination essay grading team for many years and had rated the article in the Teaching Monthly, under his real name. The Zhejiang Provincial Education Examination Institute stated that there is no problem with the grading work, and the issue of interest transfer is under investigation. However, Chen Jianxin has been suspended from participating in the national education examination work due to leaking information.

== Background ==
2020 Zhejiang College Entrance Examination Chinese Composition Test

：Everyone has their own life coordinates and beautiful expectations for the future.

Families may have different expectations for us, and society may give us different roles. In the ever-changing reality of life, it is inevitable that there will be discrepancies or mismatches between individuals and their families and society. How do you experience and think about this? Write an essay on your own views.

【 Attention 】

① Choose your own angle, concept, and topic.

② Clearly define the literary style and do not write poetry ③ Not less than 800 words ④ No plagiarism or copying.

=== Essay topic and evaluation ===
The National Unified Examination for Enrollment of Ordinary Higher Education Institutions in July 2020 was held nationwide in the People's Republic of China from July 7 to 10, 2020. On July 7 from 9:00 am to 11:30 am Beijing time (UTC+8), a Chinese language exam was held in Zhejiang. The Zhejiang college entrance examination essay topic is a semi proposition essay, requiring candidates to write from their own perspective around a piece of material with the theme of "Life coordinates and changes in reality".

When evaluating the questions, Chen Ruyi, a teacher at Hangzhou Xuejun Middle School, said that this year's Zhejiang college entrance examination essay focused on guiding candidates to think about the relationship between "self blueprint" and "expectations of others (family, society)". It is something that candidates at the crossroads of life must face, not only real but also 'complex'. And the materials also leave ample room for students to choose, highlighting the examination of "dialectical thinking" and requiring candidates to present a dialogue with self. Yang Qiaolin from Cixi Middle School commented that the topic presentation is gradual, from easy to difficult, close to real life, and has a high degree of openness. The examinee is apt to have something to say, but it has a degree of differentiation, it can reflect the differences in dialectic, depth and richness of thinking. Shen Tu Yongqing, the principal of Zhejiang University Affiliated Middle School, said the topic is actually a test of the examinee's life pattern, that "a person with no ambition, a person without responsibility, a self-centered person, can not write well".

=== Grading ===
As in past years, the college entrance examination essay marking adopts the method of online marking. In the marking paper of this college entrance examination, the system randomly provides answer paper images to the teachers of the marking group for the subjective questions, and the teachers of the marking group evaluate and give points. Each test question must be scored by two or more grading teachers. If the difference in scores given by two teachers exceeds the preset range of the system, the system will automatically assign the question to the third teacher for grading. Professor Lou Hansong, the leader of the Chinese language subject evaluation team in Zhejiang Province, said: "The subjectivity of Chinese language subject questions is strong. The evaluation team first conducts a trial evaluation, unifies the scoring standards and formulates detailed rules, and other teachers conduct a trial evaluation and discussion after learning. Among them, The most subjective essay test lasted two days." More than 2700 teachers in Zhejiang Province have been selected to participate in the evaluation of the college entrance examination. They are all university teachers with higher professional levels in their respective disciplines, or in-service high school teachers with three years or more of teaching experience, and the title of first level teacher or above in secondary schools.

=== First article agency ===
Zhejiang Teaching Monthly is managed and sponsored by Zhejiang Institute of Foreign Languages. It was founded in Hangzhou in 1979. It edited and published such newspapers as Teaching Monthly Middle School Edition, Teaching Monthly Primary School Edition, Composition Xintiandi, etc. After the completion of the college entrance examination marking work, the editorial department of "Composition New World" and the Zhejiang Provincial Writing Society jointly launched a series of manuscripts on the wechat public account of the teaching monthly "College Entrance Examination composition marking team leader evaluates the full score of College Entrance Examination composition".

=== Chief examiner ===
Chen Jianxin is the vice president and secretary general of the Zhejiang Writing Society and an associate professor at Zhejiang University. He has served as the leader of the Zhejiang Provincial College Entrance Examination Essay Marking Group for 20 years and retired from Zhejiang University a few years ago. After the incident, some self media jokingly referred to him as the "father of Zhejiang college entrance examination essays". He has edited and sold several college entrance examination essay coaching books, such as the "College Entrance Examination Essay Practical Training," priced at 59 yuan and printed for the first time in December 2019, which includes full score essay samples, reviews, etc. Another book, "Selected Essays on Discourse", is priced at 30 yuan and the content is divided into five parts. The latest revised edition published in 2017 added the "2017 College Entrance Examination Essay Scoring Standards". He has given lectures on college entrance examination essay guidance in many parts of Zhejiang, during which he also pointed out the importance of avoiding formulaic writing and opposing artificial writing styles.

== Burst red process and follow-up ==
On August 2, 2020, Teaching Monthly magazine published an essay titled "Living in a Tree" through its official wechat public account. Chen Jianxin provided comments on this. At the same time, the article also introduced that during the grading period, the first grading teacher only gave the article a score of 39, while the second grading teacher gave it a score of 55. After the system automatically submitted the article to the third examiner, the latter also gave a score of 55. The final composition review team conducted a re-examination and gave "Living on a Tree" a full score of 60. Chen Jianxin said that the composition review team carefully read this essay and unanimously gave it a high rating, the teachers of the composition review group believe that giving this article a full score demonstrates the writing level of Zhejiang high school seniors.

After the release of the full score essay, it sparked a heated discussion among netizens. The reading volume of related topics on Sina Weibo, such as # Living on Trees #, # What abilities do college entrance examination essays test for students #, and # Renmin University professors evaluate full score essays for living on trees #, quickly exceeded 100 million. On the afternoon of the 3rd, the original article "Living on Trees" on WeChat has been deleted. On the same day, the editor in chief of Composition Xintiandi replied to the reporter of Beijing Youth Daily that the review article is an invitation from the editorial department to Chen Jianxin; Chen Jianxin said he was not available for an interview. On the 4th, a staff member of the magazine told a reporter from The Paper that the article was from the essay grading team. The magazine had originally planned to continue publishing essays with full marks, but considering the ongoing Zhejiang college entrance examination enrollment work and "some technical reasons", it was decided to delete the article. As for whether to continue updating it in the future, it has not been determined yet. On the same day, a staff member of the Zhejiang Provincial Education Examination Institute said they were learning about the situation. On the same day, the cover news reporter called the Zhejiang Education Examination Institute, and the staff said that there was no problem with the marking procedure of the article.

After the incident gradually escalated, the comments on the essay turned into discussions and controversies about the Chinese language composition for the college entrance examination, and some netizens questioned the existence of profit transmission behavior in the grading process. On August 8, Li Weishui, a retired media professional from Wuhan, posted an article on his personal wechat public account and reported it to the Zhejiang Provincial Education Examination Authority under his real name. The article said that Chen Jianxin not only served as the head of the college entrance examination composition marking paper, but also wrote the college entrance examination composition guide book, the college entrance examination composition guidance lecture, etc., referring to him as "both a coach and a referee". On the afternoon of the 9th, Li Weishu said that he received a phone call from the examination court to confirm that the other party had received the report materials and had begun to investigate. On the 12th, the Beijing News reported that Chen Jianxin responded that he would not express his own opinions and believed that the organization and leadership would give him a fair and reasonable conclusion.
