= Taiping, Zhenyuan County =

Taiping 太平镇
- Town
- Location in Gansu
- Coordinates: 35°42′42″N 107°24′16″E
- Country: People's Republic of China
- Province: Gansu
- Prefecture-level city: Qingyang
- County: Zhenyuan County
- Time zone: UTC+8 (China Standard)

Taiping (Chinese: 太平; pinyin: Tàipíng) is a town in Zhenyuan County, Gansu province, China. As of 2020, it administers the following 13 villages:

- Jianbian Village (俭边村)
- Lanmiao Village (兰庙村)
- Xilan Village (席兰村)
- Zaolin Village (枣林村)
- Chaizhuang Village (柴庄村)
- Muping Village (慕坪村)
- Laozhuang Village (老庄村)
- Dayuan Village (大塬村)
- Dingxian Village (丁岘村)
- Nanzhuang Village (南庄村)
- Hewan Village (何湾村)
- Pengyang Village (彭阳村)
- Liuju Village (柳咀村)
