= Huo Jun =

General serving warlord Liu Bei (c.181–220)

- 霍峻

Administrator of Zitong (梓潼太守) (under Liu Bei)
- In office 217 – 220
- Monarch: Emperor Xian of Han

Major-General (裨將軍) (under Liu Bei)
- In office 214? – 220?
- Monarch: Emperor Xian of Han

General of the Household (中郎將) (under Liu Bei)
- In office 208 – 214
- Monarch: Emperor Xian of Han

Personal details
- Born: 181 (Note: The Sanguozhi recorded that Huo Jun was appointed as the Administrator of Zitong Commandery around 214, and he died after holding office for three years at the age of 40 (by East Asian age reckoning). Assuming he died in 217, by calculation, his year of birth should be around 178. However, vol.2 of Chronicles of Huayang dated Huo's appointment as Administrator of Zitong to the 22nd year of the Jian'an era (c.217). Thus, if the Chronicles is correct, Huo Jun's birth year should be 181 and he was about 39 years old when he died in 220.) Zhijiang, Hubei
- Died: 220 (aged 39) Zitong County, Sichuan
- Resting place: Chengdu, Sichuan
- Relations: Huo Du (brother)
- Children: Huo Yi
- Occupation: General
- Courtesy name: Zhongmiao (仲邈)

Huo Jun (181–220), courtesy name Zhongmiao, was a military general serving under the warlord Liu Bei in the late Eastern Han dynasty of China. Liu Bei thought very highly of Huo Jun and in a letter to Zhuge Liang praised him as a great warrior with many achievements. When Huo Jun died, Liu Bei deeply mourned him, led his officials during his burial and stayed overnight at his tomb which was a great honor.

== Life ==
Huo Jun was from Zhijiang County (枝江縣), Nan Commandery (南郡), Jing Province, which is in present-day Zhijiang, Hubei. His elder brother, Huo Du (霍篤), rallied a few hundred men from their hometown to form a militia. After Huo Du's death, Liu Biao, the Governor (牧) of Jing Province, put Huo Jun in command of the militia. When Liu Biao died in late 208, Huo Jun led his followers to join the warlord Liu Bei, who previously took shelter under Liu Biao. Liu Bei appointed Huo Jun as a General of the Household (中郎將).

Around 211, Liu Bei led an army from Jing Province to Yi Province (covering present-day Sichuan and Chongqing) to assist the provincial governor Liu Zhang in countering a rival warlord, Zhang Lu, in Hanzhong Commandery. In 212, when conflict broke out between Liu Bei and Liu Zhang, the former led his forces from Jiameng (葭萌) to attack the latter, leaving behind Huo Jun to defend Jiameng. At the same time, Zhang Lu sent his general Yang Bo (楊帛) to entice Huo Jun to defect to Zhang Lu, by offering to defend Jiameng together with him. Huo Jun replied to Yang Bo, "You can take a xiaoren's head but not a fortress." Yang Bo therefore retreated.

Later, Liu Zhang sent his officers Fu Jin (扶禁), Xiang Cun (向存) and others to lead an army of ten thousand soldiers to attack Jiameng. Huo Jun had only a few hundred troops with him but he managed to hold his position for a year. When he saw that the enemy was weak and negligent, he selected elite soldiers from among his men and launched a counterattack on Liu Zhang's forces, greatly defeated them and beheading Xiang Cun in battle.

In July 214, Liu Zhang surrendered to Liu Bei, after which Yi Province came under the latter's control. In recognition of Huo Jun's contributions during the campaign, Liu Bei partitioned a new commandery, Zitong (梓潼), from the original Guanghan Commandery (廣漢郡), and appointed Huo Jun as the Administrator (太守) of Zitong. Huo Jun was also promoted to the rank of a Major-General (裨將軍). (Note: In the Chronicles of Huayang, Huo Jun was not recorded to have this promotion. Thus, it is not certain if this promotion was indeed together with his appointment as Administrator of Zitong.) He held office for three years before dying at the age of 40 (by East Asian age reckoning). His body was transported to Chengdu (the capital of Yi Province) for burial. Liu Bei deeply lamented Huo Jun's death and personally led his subjects to offer sacrifices and attend Huo's funeral.

== Family ==
Huo Jun's son, Huo Yi, continued serving Liu Bei and became a general in the state of Shu Han (founded by Liu Bei) during the Three Kingdoms period. After the fall of Shu, Huo Yi served under Cao Wei and later the founding emperor of its successor (the Jin dynasty), Emperor Wu.

== See also ==
- Lists of people of the Three Kingdoms
