= 2024 Nanjing building fire =

High-rise building fire in Nanjing, China

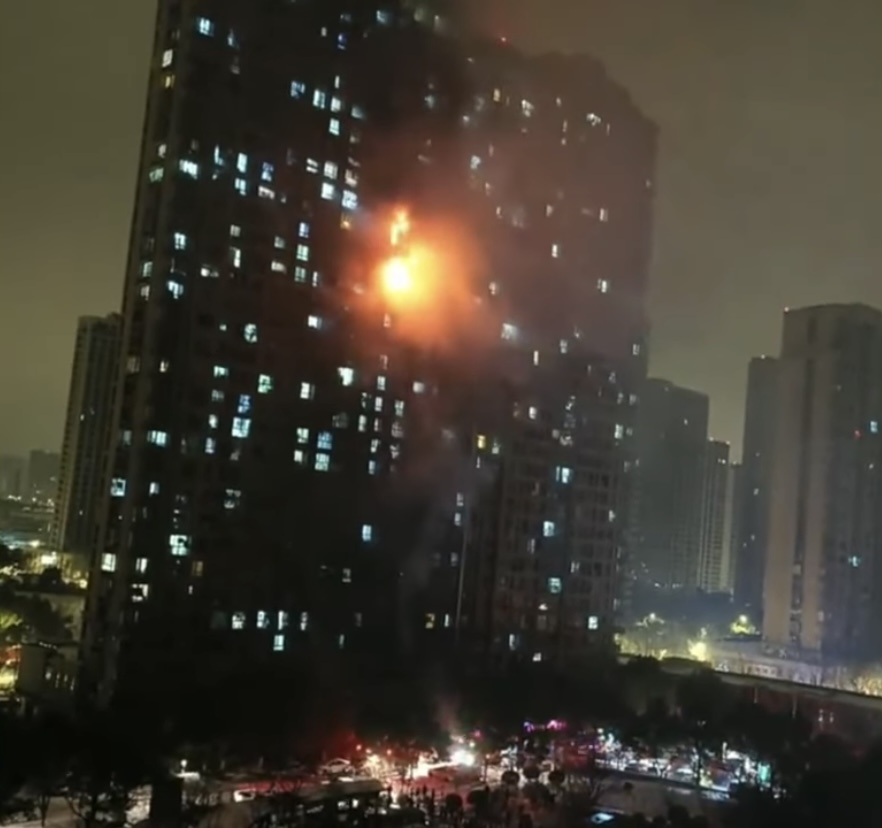
- Date: 23 February 2024
- Location: Nanjing, China; 31°56′48″N 118°41′24″E
- Type: building fire
- Deaths: 15
- Injuries: 44

On 23 February 2024, a fire broke out in an apartment block in Nanjing, China, leaving at least 15 dead and 44 others injured.

== Background ==
Due to low safety standards and poor enforcement, building fires and similar deadly incidents are common in China. Recent examples included the Yingcai Boarding School fire on 19 January 2024 where 13 children were killed in a school dormitory sparking outrage among social media users. Five days later, on 24 January, the Xinyu shopping area fire killed 39 people. After this last fire, General Secretary of the Chinese Communist Party Xi Jinping called for "deep reflection" and greater efforts to "curb the frequent occurrence of safety accidents".

== Fire ==
The fire occurred at a block of flats in the Yuhuatai district of Nanjing. At around 4:40 a.m. local time firefighters were called. 25 fire engines and 130 firefighters from eight stations went to the fire. An additional 20 rescue teams to search the complex. At 4:50 a.m., the Nanjing Emergency Center sent nine ambulances to the scene and sent the injured to three hospitals. By 6:00 a.m. local time the fire had been extinguished and a search operation was under way. The rescue operation was stopped at 2 p.m.

Photos taken during the night of the fire shows black smoke emitting from the building. Photos of the apartment building after the fire had been extinguished showed blackened fronts up to the length of the skyscraper.

=== Victims ===
Fifteen people were killed in the fire and 44 others were hospitalized, one in critical condition and another one seriously injured.

== Investigation ==
The provincial government of Jiangsu established an investigation team to investigate the cause and responsibility of the fire. According to the head of the fire department from a preliminary investigation, the fire started on the first floor where electric bikes were being stored which are known to catch fire at times. The cause of the fire is still under investigation.

== Aftermath ==
On 23 February, the Nanjing Municipal Committee of the Chinese Communist Party and the Nanjing Municipal Government established a fire response emergency headquarters. In the afternoon, the Nanjing Municipal Safety Committee meeting was held to make arrangements for the aftermath of the accident and the investigation and rectification of potential safety hazards. Jiangsu Provincial Party Committee Secretary Xin Changxing and Governor Xu Kunlin went to the hospital to visit the injured, and 516 people were accommodated in five hotels.

The blaze became a trending topic on the Chinese social media platform Weibo. By this the afternoon of 24 February it was viewed over 470 million times.

== Reactions ==
Chen Zhichang, the mayor of Nanjing, offered his condolences and apologies to the families of the victims. Some commentators, including former Global Times editor-in-chief Hu Xijin, called for stricter regulations on the increasing popularity of electric bicycles. They also called on authorities to be more proactive.

== See also ==
- List of fires in China
