= Lü Banglie =

Chinese activist (born 1971)

Lü Banglie (simplified Chinese: 吕邦列; traditional Chinese: 呂邦列; pinyin: Lǚ Bāngliè) (born 1971) is a Chinese pro-democracy activist and farmer from Baoyuesi village (宝月寺村), Bailizhou town, Zhijiang, Yichang in western Hubei province. During a period of drought in 2000, Lü began campaigning for reductions in the taxes levied upon poor farmers. Since that time Lü has campaigned on issues of land seizures, corruption, and access to health care. In 2003, Lü was elected to a position in the Zhijiang City People's Congress. In 2004, he was elected to the Baoyuesi villager committee.

Lü's political activities have led to violence against himself, his family, and his property. This attracted global media attention in 2005 when an assault on Lu was falsely reported by Guardian journalist Benjamin Joffe-Walt. The attack was allegedly intended to intimidate Lü and convince him to end his campaign against corrupt local politicians. Lü declared his intention to continue campaigning against corruption, saying, "I know there are tigers in the mountain, but I still go to the mountain." In October 2007 there were reports that Lu had been "disappeared", although these reports are difficult to substantiate.

Lü Banglie is reported to have been influenced by the thought of Mohandas Gandhi.

== See also ==
- Human rights in the People's Republic of China
