= Huo Yi =

Chinese Shu Han, Cao Wei and Jin general (died c.271)

- 霍弋

Inspector of Jiaozhi Province (交州刺史) (nominal)
- In office 263 – 271?
- Monarch: Cao Huan / Emperor Wu of Jin

Area Commander of Nanzhong (南中都督)
- In office 263 – 271?
- Monarch: Cao Huan / Sima Yan

General Who Stabilises the South (安南將軍)
- In office 263 – 266?
- Monarch: Liu Shan / Cao Huan
- Preceded by: Yan Yu

Administrator of Jianning (建寧太守)
- In office ?–?
- Monarch: Liu Shan

General Who Inspects the Army (監軍將軍)
- In office ?–?
- Monarch: Liu Shan

Gentleman of the Yellow Gate (黃門侍郎)
- In office 234 – ?
- Monarch: Liu Shan

Personal details
- Born: Unknown (Note: Huo Jun's birth year was c.181 and he died in c.220. Furthermore, Huo Yi received his first position after Liu Bei's coronation in 221. Thus, Huo Yi's birth year should be between 194 and 210.) Zhijiang, Hubei
- Died: between 266 and 271 (Note: Historical sources did not indicate when Huo died, but he had definitely died by 271, when Eastern Wu forces besieged the stronghold at Jiaozhi.)
- Children: Huo Zai
- Parent: Huo Jun (father)
- Relatives: Huo Du (uncle)
- Occupation: General
- Courtesy name: Shaoxian (紹先)

Huo Yi (died between 266 and 271), courtesy name Shaoxian, was a military general of the state of Shu Han in the Three Kingdoms period of China. His father, Huo Jun, served under Liu Bei, the founding emperor of Shu. During his service under the Shu emperor Liu Shan, Huo Yi suppressed tribal rebellions in the restive Nanzhong region and maintained peace in the area. After Shu was conquered by its rival state Cao Wei in 263, Huo Yi surrendered to the Wei regime and was permitted to remain in charge of keeping the peace in Nanzhong. In return, Huo Yi became a Wei subject and continued serving under the Jin dynasty, which replaced the Wei regime in February 266.

== Early life and career ==
Huo Yi was born in Zhijiang, Nan Commandery (南郡), which is present-day Zhijiang, Hubei. His father was Huo Jun, a general who served under the warlord Liu Bei in the late Eastern Han dynasty and died in 220. In 221, Liu Bei declared himself emperor and established the state of Shu Han, after which he appointed Huo Yi as a taizi sheren (太子舍人; an attendant to the crown prince). Liu Bei died in 223 and was succeeded by his son Liu Shan, who appointed Huo Yi as an Internuncio (謁者) after his enthronement.

Between 227 and 234, when Shu's chancellor-regent Zhuge Liang was stationed in Hanzhong Commandery during the launching of a series of military campaigns against Shu's rival state Cao Wei, he requested for Huo Yi to be transferred to his office. Huo Yi worked together with Zhuge Liang's adoptive son Zhuge Qiao during this period of time. They would travel in the same chariot and sleep in the same residence.

Huo Yi was appointed as a Gentleman of the Yellow Gate (黃門侍郎) after Zhuge Liang died in 234. Later, when Liu Shan designated his son Liu Xuan as his heir apparent, he appointed Huo Yi as a zhongshuzi (中庶子; an aide) to Liu Xuan. Liu Xuan enjoyed horse-riding and archery and used to behave recklessly, but Huo Yi managed to use teachings from ancient classics to persuade Liu Xuan to improve his behaviour therefore succeeded in providing him proper guidance.

== Service in the South ==
He was later transferred to assist with the military affairs in the Laixiang region in the southern part of Shu and appointed as Chief Controller (都督), was also assigned as Protector of the Army (護軍) while managing military affairs as before. When the tribal peoples in Yongchang Commandery (永昌郡) caused trouble using steep terrain to protect themselves while pillaging and razing nearby settlements, Huo Yi was appointed as the Administrator of Yongchang Commandery (永昌太守) and was ordered to lead troops to attack the tribes. Huo Yi achieved victory as he killed the tribal chiefs, destroyed their bases and restored peace at the borders of Yongchang. For his contributions, he was promoted to General Who Inspects the Army (監軍將軍) and appointed as the Administrator of Jianning Commandery (建寧郡), effectively being in charge of affairs in Nanzhong.

Formerly, Huo Yi was a subordinate of Yan Yu (閻宇), born from the same Nan commandery as him. As Yan Yu succeeded Zhang Biao as Area Commander of Laixiang (庲降都督). To help him, Huo Yi served under him as his deputy. As his assistant, Huo Yi demonstrated exceptional aptitude therefore he would succeed Yan Yu as General Who Stabilises the South (安南將軍).

In 257, Yan Yu led troops to assist Shi Ji in case of internal problem in Wu. The following year, Yan Yu was reassigned as Area Commander of Badong (巴東都督) near the Wu–Shu border. Although not recorded to have succeeded or appointed by the Shu Han court as Area Commander of Laixiang (庲降都督), Huo Yi was the highest authority in the region. During his tenure, Huo Yi worked to pacify foreign customs, promoted fair legislation and educated the common people. Under his rule, minor and severe offenses were resolved with appropriate sanctions, the foreigners and Han citizens safe from danger.

At the end of the year 263, the state of Cao Wei launched a campaign against Shu. Huo Yi recently promoted as General Who Stabilises the South (安南將軍) along with the Commander (領軍) of the Badong Commandery (巴東郡) Luo Xian managed to keep their respective regions secure during those turbulent times and led their officials to yield when they learned that Liu Shan surrendered. Due to their reasonable conduct, both of them remained in their previous positions and received gifts and high praises from the capital.

Previously, when he received news of the invasion, Huo Yi wanted to lead troops from Nanzhong to assist in the defence of the Shu capital Chengdu, but as Liu Shan already decided the arrangements for the defence of the city, he rejected Huo Yi's offer. Thereafter, as Chengdu could not be defended, Liu Shan surrendered to the Wei general Deng Ai, bringing an end to the Shu regime. When he learned of the fall of Shu, Huo Yi wore mourning garments and lamented greatly for three days, after which his subordinates urged him to follow in his lord's footsteps by surrendering to Wei as well. Huo Yi refused to surrender and stated that he would fight to the death unless he was assured that Liu Shan was safe and was treated well after submitting to Wei.

To his subordinates, he said :“Now that the situation reached such a critical point. And that we don't know for certain if our ruler is safe or in danger, we cannot be nonchalant in our actions. If our ruler finds an agreement with Wei to reach peace and is treated with respect then we would keep our territory safe and surrender at the right time. However, if our ruler risk danger and is treated with contempt then to the death I would resist them. In that case, all there would be to discuss would be the preparation to make!”

Upon receiving news that Liu Shan was not harmed and had moved from Chengdu to the Wei capital Luoyang, he officially surrendered to Wei, leading all the defenders of the six commanderies to dispatch a memorial :"I your servant, long I have head that the occurrences of the State take prominence over a man's life. That when a difficulty arose a loyal man should offer his life. However now that the State of your servant is overwhelmed and his ruler submitted. I believe that a defence to the death would be pointless therefore we entrust and pledge to the new State to commit to his service with full resolution."

The Wei regent Sima Zhao was very pleased so he appointed Huo Yi as the Area Commander (都督) of Nanzhong and allowed the latter to remain in charge of Nanzhong. Furthermore, the province of Jiaozhi was not yet conquered. However, Huo Yi was appointed as Inspector of Jiaozhi Province (交州刺史) to administrate it from afar and could nominate and appoint his own chief officials.

Huo Yi later sent troops to assist Lü Xing (呂興) during his revolt against the Wu government and successfully pacified the three commanderies of Jiaozhi (交阯), Rinan (日南) and Jiuzhen (九真), annexing a significant portion of the Jiao province. For his contributions, he received a marquis title and other rewards from the Jin imperial court.

According to the Han Jin Chunqiu and the Jin Shu, early on, Huo Yi alongside Yang Ji (楊稷), Mao Jiong (毛炅) and other subordinates swore an oath that if they were besieged by an enemy, then they would resist for 100 days. Otherwise their families would be executed. However, if after more than 100 days, reinforcement didn't come, then, Huo Yi would take the responsibility. In 271, while he besieged Jiaozhi's stronghold, Tao Huang heard of this pact and provided food to the city when there was famine. His subordinates remonstrated him against such a charitable act. However Tao Huang reassured them that with Huo Yi's death, Jin wouldn't be able to dispatch reinforcements to the city. (Note: In his Zizhi Tongjian Kaoyi, Sima Guang expressed his skepticism at Tao Huang sending supplies to the Jin defenders. He opinioned that given Sun Hao's temperament, Tao wouldn't dare risk his liege's wrath by sending supplies to the enemy. The account in Zizhi Tongjian was an adaptation of the one found in Chronicles of Huayang, that Eastern Wu forces sieged the defenders and won after supplies ran out and Jin reinforcements were not forthcoming.)

== Legacy ==
Chang Qu, who wrote extensively about the history of the Sichuan region in the Chronicles of Huayang (Huayang Guo Zhi), recorded that at the time he was writing (between 348 and 354), the local officials, when they interacted with the foreign tribes, were respectful of their traditions and merciful when judging them, all of which was following Huo Yi's precepts. After Huo Yi's death, his son Huo Zai (霍在) inherited the command of his soldiers and led them to establish peace with the leading clans of the south. Moreover, Huo Yi's grandson, Huo Biao (霍彪; fl.330-339), served as the Administrator of Yuexi/Yuesui Commandery (越嶲郡) during the Jin dynasty. By 332, Huo Biao was Administrator of Jianning. In c.November that year, Cheng-Han generals Li Shou (later its emperor and posthumously known as Emperor Zhaowen) and Fei Hei (费黑) set out to attack Ningzhou. Huo Biao was sent to help defend Zhuti (朱提) by Yin Feng (尹奉), Inspector of Ningzhou. On 16 February the following year, Huo Biao and Dong Bing (董炳; Inspector of Zhuti) surrendered to Li Shou. The next mention of Huo Biao in historical records was as Cheng-Han's Inspector of Jianning in c.April 339. In that month, Eastern Jin's Inspector of Guangzhou, Deng Yue (邓岳), attacked Cheng-Han's Ningzhou; Cheng-Han's Administrator of Jianning, Meng Yan (孟彦), seized Huo Biao and surrendered to Eastern Jin.

== See also ==
- Lists of people of the Three Kingdoms
