= Taobao village =

Pattern of e-commerce in rural Chinese villages

Taobao villages (simplified Chinese: 淘宝村; traditional Chinese: 淘寶村; pinyin: Táobǎo cūn) are rural Chinese villages where the local economy has developed to focus extensively on e-commerce via the Taobao online retail platform. Taobao villages have contributed to economic development and rural revitalization in China.

== Definition ==
Taobao villages are rural Chinese villages where the local economy has developed to focus extensively on e-commerce via the Taobao platform. Alibaba's research division defines Taobao villages as those in which (1) businesses are located in an administrative village in a rural area, (2) the village's annual e-commerce revenues exceed RMB 10 million, and (3) the village has either an excess of 100 active online shops or active online shops account for more than 10% of village households.

== Overview ==
Taobao villages are concentrated in China's coastal regions, particularly in Zhejiang province (which is where Alibaba, which operated the Taobao platform, is located). Zhijiang City in Hubei province also has a significant cluster of Taobao villages. As of at least 2023, Taobao villages are increasingly developed in inland parts of China.

Taobao villages first began appearing in 2009. By 2013, twenty Taobao villages existed in China. In 2020, 5,425 such villages existed, generating total annual revenue of RMB 1,000 billion via 29,600 active online shops.

== Impact ==
The geographical clustering of e-commerce businesses in Taobao villages have mutual benefits for these businesses, as opposed to when they operate in greater isolation. Geographic clustering of e-commerce businesses facilitates knowledge exchange and allows for increased labor market pooling. Increased economic activities also can attract government-subsidized capital.

Because Taobao villages have increased the incomes of rural people and entrepreneurship in rural China, Taobao villages have become a component of rural revitalization strategies.

The spontaneous development of Taobao Villages inspired the Rural Taobao program, a rural e-commerce project undertaken by the Chinese government and Alibaba. This program aimed to provide rural households with the same level of access to consumer goods that urban residents have and to facilitate the sale of agricultural goods through e-commerce. As of 2017, the program covered 16,500 villages.

== See also ==
- Economy of China
- Economic History of China (1949-present)
