= Murder of Xie Tianqin =

2015 murder in Fuzhou, Fujian, China

Xie Tianqin (谢天琴), a Chinese woman, was murdered by her son Wu Xieyu (吴谢宇) in Fuzhou, Fujian, China on 10 July 2015 at the age of 47. Wu Xieyu subsequently defrauded relatives and friends of 1.44 million yuan under false pretenses surrounding his mother.

== Murder ==
Pessimistic and tired of life, Wu had had thoughts of suicide. After his father died of illness, he believed that his mother’s life had lost its meaning.

On July 10, 2015, Peking University student Wu Xieyu murdered Xie Tianqin, his mother, in Fuzhou, and wrapped her body in multiple layers of plastic with activated carbon added to subdue smells related to decomposition. He then left the body in the dormitory where the crime occurred.

== Related fraud ==
Wu concealed from his relatives and friends the truth of Xie Tianqin's murder, instead telling them that Xie accompanied him to study abroad. He defrauded relatives and friends of 1.44 million yuan under the pretext of needing living expenses, tuition fees, and proof of financial resources. In order to evade investigation, Wu purchased more than ten identity documents to hide his identity.

Statistics on related fraud
Relationship with Wu Xieyu	The amount defrauded
Maternal uncle	560,000 yuan
Father's friends(5 people)	610,000 yuan
Maternal aunt	200,000 yuan
Paternal aunt	70,000 yuan^{[in the name of paying back]}

== Investigation ==
On February 14, 2016, Xie Tianqin’s body was discovered. On April 20, 2019, the police arrested Wu Xieyu at Chongqing Jiangbei International Airport. He remained in mainland China under investigation for the following three years.

== Trials ==
On August 26, 2021, the Fuzhou Intermediate People's Court sentenced Wu Xieyu to death in the first-instance verdict, which Wu appealed. On March 21, 2022, the High People's Court of Fujian Province stated that the second-instance verdict of this case was suspended due to “irresistible reasons”. On May 19, 2023, the High People's Court of Fujian Province held a second-instance trial of the case. On May 30, 2023, the Fujian Provincial High People’s Court publicly pronounced its verdict in the second instance and ruled to reject the appeal and uphold the death sentence.

== Individuals involved ==
=== Perpetrator ===
Wu Xieyu
- 吴谢宇
- Born: October 7, 1994; Nanping, Fujian, China
- Died: January 31, 2024 (aged 29); Fuzhou, Fujian, China
- Cause of death: Execution by lethal injection
- Education: Bachelor's degree (ungraduated)
- Height: 1.83 m (6 ft 0 in)
- Status: Executed
- Conviction: Convicted of all three charges
- Criminal charges: Murder; Fraud; Buying and selling identity documents
- Penalty: Death(murder); 11 years (fraud); 3 years and fined 103,000 CNY.(buying and selling identity documents)

Details
- Victims: Xie Tianqin
- Date: July 10, 2015 (aged 47) approx. 17:00
- Locations: Unit 102, Building 5, Staff Dormitory of the Second Affiliated Middle School of the College of Education, No. 172 Guishan Road, Jin'an District, Fuzhou, Fujian, China
- Killed: 1
- Weapon: Dumbbell
- Date apprehended: April 20, 2019

Wu Xieyu (October 7, 1994 – January 31, 2024), from Nanping, Fujian, originally from Putian. In 1996, due to his parents’ job transfer, the whole family moved from Nanping to Fuzhou to live. In 2006, he was admitted to the Second Affiliated Middle School of Fuzhou Education College where his mother worked. In 2009, he was admitted to Fuzhou No.1 Middle School with the highest score in the school and continued to rank among the top students in high school. In 2012, he was recommended for admission to the School of Economics at Peking University. He was also awarded as a Triple-A Student (a straight A student) at Peking University in his freshman year and received a Liao Kaiyuan Scholarship of 10,000 yuan in his sophomore year. In his junior year, he had plans to study abroad. In September 2014, he participated in a GRE training program organized by an institution and scored 165 (out of 170) on Verbal, 170 (out of 170) on Quantitative and 4.5 (out of 6) on Analytical Writing, ranking in the top 5% globally. The institution also awarded him a scholarship of 6,000 yuan.

=== Victim ===
Xie Tianqin (December 25, 1967 – July 10, 2015), the mother of the suspect Wu Xieyu, was a middle school history teacher. In the late 1980s, she graduated from a normal school and became a history teacher at Nanping Railway Children’s Middle School in Fuzhou Branch. In 1992, she married Wu Zhijian (died in 2010), whom she met in Nanping. Later, in 1994, they had their only child, Wu Xieyu. At the end of 1996, due to the cancellation of Nanping Railway Children’s Middle School in Fuzhou Branch, Xie Tianqin went to Fuzhou Railway Middle School (renamed as the Second Affiliated Middle School of Fuzhou Education College in 2003) to continue her work as a history teacher.

== Events ==
At the end of June 2015, Wu Xieyu purchased various tools online such as knives, waterproof cloth, plastic cloth, isolation suits, doctor and nurse uniforms.

On July 10, 2015, approx. 17:00, Wu Xieyu took advantage of Xie Tianqin’s return home to change her shoes and struck her head and face several times with a dumbbell bar, causing her death.

In mid-July 2015, Wu Xieyu began to send messages to his relatives saying that he was about to go to the Massachusetts Institute of Technology in the United States as an exchange student and that his mother Xie Tianqin would accompany him to study in the United States and would take a flight on July 25. Then Wu Xieyu used the excuse of needing money to go abroad and borrowed money from his mother’s relatives, colleagues and friends in his own and his mother’s name through various means of communication. The total amount borrowed was as high as 1.44 million yuan, all of which was transferred to Xie Tianqin’s bank card. The password for the card was Wu Xieyu’s birthday. Wu Xieyu also copied his mother’s diary and cut out some words to piece together a resignation letter. In Oct 2015, the grade director of Xie Tianqin's workplace received a resignation form that Wu had created by imitating Xie's handwriting and sent from Shanghai. It was precisely because of Wu Xieyu’s careful cover-up that his relatives and friends did not notice anything unusual for half a year.

From July 12 to 23, 2015, Wu Xieyu purchased activated carbon, plastic film and other items online several times and installed surveillance cameras and alarms on the scene.

On February 5, 2016 (the 27th day of the twelfth lunar month), Wu Xieyu’s uncle received a text message from Wu Xieyu saying that he and his mother would return from Boston, US, and arrive at Putian Railway Station in Fujian on February 6. On February 6, Xie Tianqin’s family failed to pick them up at Putian station and received no response to phone calls or text messages. They rushed to their home in Fuzhou but no one answered the door. Relatives were worried that something had happened to them and reported it to the police. The police initially speculated that the mother and son might be hiding from relatives came collecting debt, but Xie Tianqin’s colleagues told relatives that they had seen Wu Xieyu on campus at the end of July 2015. Relatives approached the leaders of Xie Tianqin’s workplace and asked them to pry open the door, but were refused. A later reward notice from the police showed that from February 4 to 6, Wu Xieyu was staying at a hotel in Henan. At around 23:00 on February 4, Wu Xieyu withdrew money from a cash machine in Henan and was captured by surveillance cameras. This was the last time Wu Xieyu appeared in public images before being captured.

On February 14, 2016 (the seventh day of the Spring Festival), Fuzhou police discovered that the victim Xie Tianqin was killed in her residence at Unit 102, Building 5 of the Second Affiliated Middle School of Education College at No. 172 Guishan Road, Jin’an District, Fuzhou. After investigation, the police found that her son Wu Xieyu was a major suspect and had fled. Through investigation, the police learned that in July 2015, Wu Xieyu had left Fuzhou by train; in October, Wu Xieyu had stayed in a hotel in Fuzhou; on October 7, Wu Xieyu celebrated his birthday and had a phone conversation with his relatives; at the end of December, Wu Xieyu even returned to his dormitory at Peking University and asked his classmates about retaking exam in the second semester of his junior year.

On March 3, 2016, Fuzhou police issued a reward notice for this case. On May 19, the Shangqiu police in Henan also assisted in issuing a reward notice, stating that Wu Xieyu may have fled to Henan. However, there was still no trace about Wu Xieyu.

According to the Fuzhou police, after committing the crime, the suspect Wu Xieyu sealed off the staff dormitory and placed the body on the bed, wrapping it in layers of plastic cloth, a total of 75 layers, and placed activated carbon in the gaps to subdue stinks. When the police broke in, they first found a human-shaped object wrapped in plastic cloth on Wu Xieyu’s bed. After unwrapping it, they found that it was a dummy. Then they found the real body under the bed, also tightly wrapped. In addition, he also installed surveillance cameras in the room and connected them to a computer. The curtains were tightly closed and all light-transmitting places in the room were covered with black tape. After killing his mother, Wu borrowed money in his mother’s name.

After leaving Henan, Wu Xieyu traveled to coastal cities such as Shanghai and Shenzhen. Later, due to the alerted public, he chose to take a bus to the inland areas and finally settled in Chongqing under the alias "Zhou Long". He claimed to have graduated from Peking University when tutoring students but claimed to have graduated from Tsinghua University when talking to colleagues and customers at nightclubs. However, everyone thought he was bragging and no one believed him. During his time on the run, he purchased more than thirty forged identity cards.

In February 2019, Wu Xieyu resigned from his job at the nightclub and worked as a waiter at a bar under the alias Zhang Weijin. According to bar staff, Wu Xieyu’s appearance at the time was very different from the photo on the reward notice. He claimed to be from Hunan, but his accent was clearly different from that of another colleague from Hunan. During his time working at the bar, he visited prostitutes several times.

== Detainment ==
On April 21, 2019, Wu Xieyu, who had been on the run for three years, was arrested by the police while boarding a plane at Chongqing Jiangbei International Airport. However, The Paper cited an interview with a woman surnamed Chen from Chongqing who witnessed Wu Xieyu’s arrest and obtained confirmation from authoritative sources that Wu Xieyu was arrested at around 4:00 am on April 20. He went to the airport not to board a plane but to see off a female friend (also a customer he was pursuing) who was flying to Wuhan. When Wu Xieyu entered the T2 terminal of Jiangbei Airport, the Sky Eye took his images and compared with its facial recognition system four times in the entrance security check area. Each time, the similarity comparison with his wanted photo was greater than or equal to 98%, confirming that it was Wu Xieyu himself. Chongqing police quickly dispatched and arrested Wu Xieyu shortly after he entered the terminal building. The woman surnamed Chen said that she had only met Wu Xieyu three times and was not familiar with him. She only learned his name after he was arrested and only learned from a friend several days later that he was a murderer and was very scared. Staff at the bar where Wu Xieyu worked confirmed that the person Wu Xieyu went to see off was the manager of the bar.

== Interrogation and arrest ==
On April 28, 2019, the police conducted a preliminary interrogation of Wu Xieyu for about 8 hours. Wu Xieyu did not deny killing his mother, but he avoided answering core questions about the case such as motive, the course of the crime and his own situation after the crime. He “basically did not give a direct answer”. He only actively expressed himself when it came to knowledge-based topics unrelated to the case. This behavior and attitude towards the police were considered to be very similar to that of the murderer in the Baiyin case.

On May 27, 2019, the Fuzhou Jin'an People's Procuratorate made a decision to approve the arrest of the suspect Wu Xieyu.

== Trial and appeal ==
On December 24, 2020, the Fuzhou Intermediate People’s Court held a public trial of this case.

During the trial, Wu Xieyu stated that the process of his father’s death at home had a great impact on him. When he mentioned his father, he could not help but burst into tears. When he mentioned his mother, he only said that she was a "good woman", a "good wife" and a "good mother".

After being admitted to Peking University, he began to doubt his own health and became cynical, even attempting suicide. During the Spring Festival in 2015, Wu Xieyu found that his mother liked Leslie Cheung very much and also loved to watch Dream of the Red Chamber. He thought that his mother "might want to be like brother (Leslie Cheung)" and "might finally want to be like Daiyu", "not eating or drinking, only seeking to die quickly". He then had the idea of killing his mother and committing suicide, thinking that this would allow him to reunite with his father and also help his mother "transcend her suffering". In April, Wu Xieyu began to plan to kill his mother and chose July 10 (the reverse of Wu Xieyu’s birthday on October 7) as the date. On that day, Xie Tianqin was killed by Wu Xieyu with a dumbbell when she returned home. After killing his mother and seeing the gruesome scene, he gave up on committing suicide.

Wu Xieyu stated during the trial that he believed that his father’s death was an important turning point in his life. Not only did it cause him psychological problems and increasingly tense relations with his mother, but it also made him paranoidly believe that it was because his relatives were unwilling to lend a hand that his father died of illness. Later on, when he defrauded money from his relatives, there was some element of revenge.

He once drugged the alcohol and water that his ex-girlfriend drank when they broke up and burned a computer containing a large number of pornography videos. He also met a girlfriend who worked in the sex industry when he was on the run and lived with her. He was generous with spending money on her and often spent lots of money on lottery tickets. He even took out more than 100,000 yuan to propose marriage to her, which led to financial difficulties later on.

At the trial scene, Wu Xieyu did not deny the charges brought by the prosecution. The prosecution charged Wu Xieyu with murder, fraud and buying and selling identity documents and should be punished according to law. The court announced an adjournment and will pronounce sentence at a later date. Wu Xieyu’s uncle on his father and mother sides and other relatives issued the document of forgiveness stating that Wu may have mental disorders and requested leniency.

On August 26, 2021, the Fuzhou Intermediate People’s Court publicly pronounced sentence on Wu Xieyu’s case. The defendant Wu Xieyu was sentenced to death for murder; sentenced to eleven years imprisonment for fraud; sentenced to three years imprisonment for buying and selling identity documents; decided to execute the death penalty; deprived of political rights for life; and fined 130,000 yuan. On September 6, Wu Xieyu’s defense lawyer Feng Min stated that Wu Xieyu had formally filed an appeal. The appeal was mailed by him personally to the court and the lawyer did not see the specific appeal. In October, before the second trial, Wu Xieyu applied for an additional defense attorney named Xu Xin from Beijing. Wu Xieyu had read his works while in detention and will apply for a mental evaluation. However, during the first trial, Wu had repeatedly refused suggestions from defense attorneys to undergo mental evaluation. Wu Xieyu had no objection to the facts determined in the first instance but felt that the sentence was too heavy and hoped to be able to redeem himself while alive. Xu Xin stated that there is still a slim chance for this case in the second instance although it is very likely that it will uphold the original verdict. Although Wu Xieyu is a "bad person" in the traditional sense and defending a murderer is easily accused of exonerating "bad people", this is precisely the starting point for defending criminal cases. It is a guarantee of procedural justice and also a guarantee of legal rights for criminal suspects. Otherwise this system would be meaningless. He also believes that cases of close relatives killing each other are not uncommon and society as a whole needs to reflect on this tragedy.

In October 2021, Wu Xieyu wrote a 50,000-word letter of repentance to his relatives, including his aunt, uncle on his father and mother's sides, who had been defrauded of money by him. In the letter, Wu Xieyu believed that he had hypochondria, which all started when he was a sickly kitty in his childhood. He had suffered from skin diseases and asthma and was ridiculed by his classmates. After his father’s death, he no longer trusted hospitals and doctors. In his senior year of high school, he had heart problems and experienced palpitations, angina and other symptoms multiple times after entering university. However, he never took the medicine prescribed by the school hospital for fear of becoming a "medicine jar" like his father. In 2015, he once thought that he would die suddenly at any time. Wu Xieyu resented his relatives because they did not inform him in advance when his father Wu Zhijian was seriously ill, causing father and son to miss their last meeting; his father died because his relatives did not help; after his father’s death, the comforting words of his relatives seemed too "light" in Wu Xieyu’s eyes. But the truth is that Wu Zhijian never asked for help from his relatives when he was alive and always adopted conservative treatment. He gave up treatment mainly to leave this world at home. Wu Xieyu defrauded his aunt’s retirement money because of resentment. His uncle lived on borrowed money as a result and divorced his wife. Wu Xieyu believed that he had always been relatively closed off inside and did not know how to confide in others. His parents always felt that "children don’t need to worry about adult matters". His father never taught him "men’s problems" and family relationships were relatively cold. Wu Xieyu attributed the root cause of his crime to the illusory world of novels and movies multiple times. He claimed that he had no opinions of his own and always followed others’ opinions. He never made judgments on his own and confused illusion with reality. The love he fantasized about in his mind had become completely distorted by the time he went to college, and it was illusory and chaotic. Regarding his mother Xie Tianqin, Wu Xieyu believed that she had not recovered from the loss of her husband for a long time and was afraid of seeing people like him for fear of being looked down upon. After killing his mother, Wu Xieyu opened her diary and saw words such as "Fortunately our son is so outstanding.", "Jian, you have to bless me and Xiaoyu." Wu Xieyu wrote: "This most terrible pain and regret crushed me. I couldn’t bear it. I ran away. I left my mother alone at home." During the trial, Wu Xieyu saw for the first time what his mother looked like after she died and could not imagine that she would be "so ugly and terrifying". He asked for forgiveness from his relatives in the letter and said that he was unwilling to die as a criminal and wanted to do something while alive. According to the provisions of the Criminal Procedure Law of the People's Republic of China, although Wu Xieyu’s aunt and uncle issued the document of forgiveness, it can only reduce the sentence for Wu Xieyu’s fraud charge and has little significance for the overall sentence. Only if the close relatives of the victim of murder, namely Wu Xieyu’s aunt and uncle (Xie Tianqin’s sister and brother), agree to forgive him can Wu Xieyu possibly avoid death penalty. As for whether to forgive their nephew or not, Wu Xieyu’s uncle did not make a clear statement.

On December 14, 2021, the High People's Court of Fujian Province issued a notice that Wu Xieyu’s case would be heard in the second instance on December 17, but the notice was subsequently withdrawn. Wu Xieyu’s defense lawyer Xu Xin responded that the message he received was that there would be a pre-trial meeting on the 17th, not a trial. The next day, Xu Xin confirmed that due to the control of the COVID-19 pandemic in Fuzhou, the pre-trial meeting originally scheduled for December 17 was postponed and the specific time would be notified separately. The meeting will be held via video and will not be open to the public. On December 17, reporters learned from Xu Xin that the second instance pre-trial meeting originally scheduled for that morning was cancelled due to pandemic control and the time was to be determined. Wu Xieyu’s other defense lawyer Feng Min withdrew from the second instance defense due to other reasons.

On March 21, 2022, the High People's Court of Fujian Province issued a criminal ruling stating that during the trial process, due to irresistible reasons and in accordance with Article 206(1)(4) of the Criminal Procedure Law of the People’s Republic of China, it ruled to suspend the trial of this case.

On May 19, 2023, Wu Xieyu’s Matricide Case was heard in the second instance.

On May 19, 2023, the High People's Court of Fujian Province held a public trial of this case in the second instance. After the trial ended, the court announced an adjournment and will pronounce sentence at a later date. On May 30, 2023, the High People's Court of Fujian Province publicly pronounced sentence on Wu Xieyu’s appeal for murder, fraud and buying and selling identity documents in the second instance. The court ruled to reject the appeal and uphold the original death sentence.

== Execution ==
On January 31, 2024, Wu Xieyu was executed by lethal injection at the age of 29. Fuzhou Intermediate People's Court said that despite being notified that he could meet with relatives before the execution, Wu declined.

== Related comments ==
=== Reflections on education ===
Wu Xieyu was a top student, someone else’s child, and Peking University talent who had excellent grades since childhood and was almost perfect in the eyes of his relatives and friends. However, he brutally murdered his own mother with premeditation and careful planning, causing widespread concern from the Chinese society. Wu Xieyu once claimed that he was an exam machine and knew nothing but exams. Many mainstream media and psychological, educational and legal experts have reflected on Wu Xieyu’s matricide case from the perspectives of parent-child relationships, family education, mental health and personality development. They pointed out that Wu Xieyu’s tragedy was largely due to the psychological problems that arose in his long-suppressed parent-child relationship. Traditional educational concepts only value children’s academic performance and believe that everything will be fine as long as they do well in school. However, they neglect their mental and personal development. Therefore, parents and teachers must abandon this wrong concept and strengthen their children’s psychological education, moral education, family education, life education and sex education. They must pay more attention to their children’s mental health, strengthen cooperation between home and school, provide correct guidance and cultivate their children into truly healthy and well-rounded individuals.

=== Criticism of media ===
On May 15, 2019, at noon, the public account Shengtong Self-Study that published the article Peking University Top Student Kills Mother and Proposes to "Prostitute" Exposes refuted rumors that the content of the article was purely fictional. Many netizens questioned its motive for publishing the article and condemned it for fabricating articles for commercial interests by following hot topics, which has already constituted rumor-mongering. On the afternoon of May 15, after a large number of users complained that the account had violated regulations, it was no longer accessible.

On December 25, 2020, the day after Wu Xieyu’s case opened in court, Nanfang Daily published a commentary entitled Discussion on Wu Xieyu’s Case Cannot Lose Focus. The article pointed out that since the case occurred, many media outlets have focused their reports on the two words Peking University. This labeling behavior, like the previous Peking University student delivering takeout and Peking University student selling pork, ignores facts such as the suspect’s personal background and drive for action. It constitutes a stigmatization of Peking University and generalizes with partiality. It sets up stereotypes artificially and induces public opinion direction, causing public discussion of the case to gradually deviate from the right track.

In addition to this, since Wu Xieyu’s case occurred, many news experts and scholars have also published academic papers criticizing media behaviors that violate journalistic ethics in crime news reporting such as entertainmentization, storytelling, labeling, privacy digging, trail by media and inaccurate narratives. They clearly pointed out the possible negative impact of these behaviors on society.

== Related works ==
The prototype of Tang Xiaoyun’s matricide case in Episode 16 of the 2022 TV series Bottom Line is Wu Xieyu’s matricide case. In the play, Tang Xiaoyun (played by Zhang Yuqi) is a top student who obtained a high-paying job at a foreign company after graduating from graduate school. However, long-term high-pressure control and moral kidnapping led to conflicts with his mother Xiao (played by Hu Caihong), resulting in him killing her on her birthday, hiding her body in a freezer, fleeing everywhere, eating, drinking, whoring and gambling, and finally being caught by the law and sentenced to death. The presiding judge in the play, Song Yufei (played by Wang Xiuzhu), said: “A suspect killed his mother, but did he really kill his mother? Before he killed his mother, his mother’s strict education had already killed this child… How many people saw this child being tortured mentally?” Wu Xieyu’s defense lawyer Xu Xin said in an interview that Wu Xieyu had said that he hoped his case could serve as a warning. Another defense lawyer Zheng Xiaojing said that she had previously visited Wu Xieyu who was waiting for the second trial in detention. Wu Xieyu already knew that his case had been brought to the screen but did not accept the setting of Tang Xiaoyun’s mother as a control freak and did not want his mother to be portrayed as a bad person.
