= He Pan (Jin dynasty) =

Jin dynasty official and scholar (244–301)

- 何攀

Minister of Finance (大司農)
- In office ?–?
- Monarch: Sima Zhong

Inspector of Yan Province (兗州刺史)
- In office ?–?
- Monarch: Sima Zhong

Minister of Justice (廷尉)
- In office ?–?
- Monarch: Sima Yan

Gentleman of the Palace (郎中)
- In office ?–?
- Monarch: Sima Yan

Registrar (主簿)
- In office ? – 263
- Monarch: Liu Shan

Personal details
- Born: 244 Pi County, Sichuan
- Died: 301 (aged 57) Luoyang
- Spouse: Pei's daughter
- Relations: He Xian (ancestor); He Feng (brother); three other brothers; He Sui (relative)
- Children: He Zhang
- Parent: He Bao (father)
- Occupation: Official, scholar
- Courtesy name: Huixing (惠興)
- Posthumous name: Duke Huan (桓公)
- Peerage: Duke of Xicheng (西城公)

He Pan (244–301), courtesy name Huixing, was an official and scholar of the state of Shu Han in the Three Kingdoms period of China. After the fall of Shu in 263, he continued serving under the Jin dynasty, which succeeded Cao Wei state in 266.

== Life ==
He Pan was born in Pi County, Shu Commandery (蜀郡), which is present-day Pi County, Sichuan. He was from a distinguished family as he was a descendant of He Xian (何顯), Administrator of Yingchuan (潁川太守) and younger brother of the Han minister, He Wu (何武). (Note: He Wu has a biography in vol.86 of Book of Han.) His father was He Bao (何包), whose courtesy name, was Xiuyang (休楊), he was recommended as a xiucai (秀才; person who passed the county level imperial exam) and nominated as a xiaolian (civil service candidate) in the Shu Han government but did not pursue these positions. He Pan and his four brothers were all well known. He Pan exhibited extraordinary talent from a young age. Furthermore, his physical appearance is described as unique and outstanding. Before he reached adulthood (around 19 years old), he served in his home commandery (Shu) as Registrar (主簿). Then, as official in the provincial government, likely under Yuan Shao (袁邵) during his brief tenure as Inspector of Yi Province (益州刺史) between 264 and 266.

Huangfu Yan (皇甫晏) was the next Inspector of Yi Province (益州刺史). He praised He Pan as one who had the talent to assist an hegemon and appointed him as his Registrar (主簿). However, He Pan returned home to care for his foster mother. Thereafter, in 272. Huangfu Yan was accused of treason and killed by general Zhang Hong (張弘) and others. He Pan took on the responsibility of the mourning period and went directly to the capital Luoyang to argue for his late superior's innocence successfully clearing Huangfu Yan's name. Later, Wang Jun became the new Inspector of Yi Province (益州刺史), he reappointed He Pan as Registrar (主簿) and Bieja (別駕; important assistant to the governor of the province).

In 277, Wang Jun received an imperial edict to disband the Tuntian soldiers and build ships for a campaign against the Eastern Wu. He Pan warned Wang Jun that there were only 600 farming soldiers, with those conditions it would take a long time to build the ships. Furthermore, by going so slowly, the wood may rot before the completion is done which would not be efficient and encouraging for the campaign. He suggested calling back the reserve soldiers and military officials, recruiting over 10 000 people to construct the ships. With such numbers, the task could be completed within a year.

Before the recruitment of so many soldiers, Wang Jun wanted to report the proposal to the capital. However, He Pan disagreed and told him that although Jin officials wanted to conquer Wu, many were still doubtful and fearful about the project. Therefore, they may prevent any advancement by using discussions as a pretext. In that case, the soldiers wouldn't be levied and the ships not completed in time. He highlighted the importance of quick actions in those operations and advised him to start before they reported it so there would be no way to stop the invasion plan. Wang Jun then remarked that going deep in the forests looking for the specified wood such as pine and cypresses then bring him back here for the construction of boats would be an hazardous task. He Pan answered that many structures are built from this wood, encouraging him to use it from those present in the cities or found on the market. Accentuating the importance of speed. Wang Jun agreed with He Pan's proposal and tasked him with overseeing the shipbuilding process.

During the winter, He Pan was sent as an envoy to Luoyang. He suggested that in order to achieve their goals, they needed to gain the trust of influential people, such as Yang Hu, an ally of the state. He Pan traveled from Luoyang to Jing province, discussing the military strategy with Zong Ting (宗廷), who was initially unconvinced. He then met with Yang Hu and together, they planned the key points of the military campaign against the Wu kingdom.

Yang Hu was delighted with the plans, and they eventually submitted a request to launch the campaign against Wu. Soon after, Wang Jun was promoted to the position of Prancing Dragon General (龍驤將軍), with He Pan appointed as Gentleman of the Palace (郎中). Sima Yan appreciated his ability and knew that He Pan was a talented military instructor therefore he ordered him to keep serving as advisor to the army. He Pan frequently traveled to Luoyang on official business. At that time, he was not yet married, but the Excellency of Works (司空), Pei (裴) admired his talents and arranged for his daughter to betrothed him.

In the autumn of 279, He Pan was sent to Luoyang. The General Who Stabilizes the East (安東將軍), Wang Hun reported that Sun Hao of the Eastern Wu was planning a northern expedition and the border guards were on high alert. The court discussed making preparations to resist however it would take a long time to assemble the defenses. He Pan submitted a memorial stating that Sun Hao would not dare to attack advising that it would be better to seize the opportunity to launch an offensive campaign and take advantage of the current alertness, which would make the victory easy. Zhang Hua consulted with He Pan on various difficulties and He Pan provided solutions for all of them. He Pan also suggested that Wang Jun who was loyal and resolute should be promoted to a higher position. The imperial decree appointed Wang Jun as the General Who Pacifies the East (平東將軍) and placed him in charge of affairs in the two western provinces of Liang and Yi.

During the invasion, Sun Hao surrendered to Wang Jun rather than Wang Hun. As the latter was jealous of the former's achievement and wanted to attack his armies. He Pan convinced his superior to send Sun Hao to Wang Hun hence avoiding further conflict. With this, the matter was resolved peacefully.

After the conquest of Wu, He Pan was enfeoffed as a Secondary Marquis (關內侯). Wang Jun entered the capital to assist the government, and He Pan served as his Major (司馬). He Pan submitted five essays on current affairs and was appointed as the Prefect of Xingyang (滎陽令). Later, he was promoted to the position of Minister of Justice (廷尉). At this time, another minister Zhuge Chong (諸葛沖) thought lightly of him as he was from Shu, it was only after working with him that he realized He Pan's talents. Once, there was a case of a thief opening the city gates which according to the law warranted the death penalty. He Pan argued that the punishment should be reduced as the upper gates were for the display of trust while the lower gates were for storage. His argument prevailed and the death penalty was reduced. He Pan was involved in many legal discussions and was later appointed as a Cavalier Gentleman-in-Attendance (散騎侍郎).

When Yang Jun conspired to rebel, He Pan was among the officials who were summoned. He Pan along with the Palace Attendants Fu Zhi (傅祗), Wang Kai (王愷) and others went to the meeting. Emperor Hui of Jin, following the advice of Sima Wei and the Palace Gentleman, Meng Guan (孟觀) ordered a strict guard and executed Yang Jun. As Yang Jun's external forces were in a hurry, He Pan and Fu Zhi climbed over the wall and managed to escape to serve the emperor. The Emperor appointed He Pan as the Colonel Who Assists the Army (翊軍校尉) and gave him command of the Xiongqu troops. In one battle, Yang Jun was beheaded and the state was secure. He Pan was enfeoffed as the Duke of Xicheng (西城公) with a fief of 10 000 households along with 10 000 rolls of silk . The Emperor praised He Pan's loyalty, bravery and determination. Other members of He Pan's family also received titles and wealth by association. He Pan refused half of the households and riches while distributed the rest among his distant relatives with nothing for himself.

He Pan was later promoted to various positions. During his tenure, he was known for his virtuous teachings and effective administration. He served for 3 years as Inspector of Yan Province (兗州刺史). When the General Who Conquers Barbarians, Shi Chong reported military activities in the southeast, He Pan was recalled and appointed as the Minister of Finance (大司農) overseeing the administration of three provinces. He Pan later resigned from his post due to illness and old age, requested that Ren Xi and Fei Ji take over his duties. However, his request was denied. He was then reappointed as the Inspector of Yan Province (兗州刺史); although other officials tried to convince him to accept the function, he declined the position along with the offered treasures.

At that time, the imperial court was in decline and many loyal and upright officials were persecuted. Princes were constantly rising and forming factions. He Pan closed his doors to focus on treating his illness and stayed away from worldly affairs. Until Sima Lun usurped power from the Emperor and summoned him. He Pan was critically ill but Sima Lun threatened to have him killed. Therefore, he had no choice but to come to Luoyang. At his arrival, the court wanted to promote him but he died at the age of 57 (by East Asian age reckoning) according to the Huayang Guo Zhi or at the age of 58 (by East Asian age reckoning) according to the Jin Shu. The Emperor mourned his death, granting him the posthumous title "Duke Huan" (桓公). His son, He Zhang (何璋) inherited his father's title.

== Appraisal ==
Chang Qu, who wrote He Pan's biography in the Chronicles of Huayang (Huayang Guo Zhi), (Note: He Pan's biography is recorded in the eleventh volume of the Huayang Guo Zhi, titled Biographies of later worthies (後賢志), covering the life of notable persons from the Sichuan region who lived during the Jin dynasty.) appraised He Pan as follows: "Prepare plans, his thoughts auspicious and bring peace."

He Pan's character was inclined toward justice. In office, his conduct was solemn. He also enjoyed giving appraisal of people, was an honest scholar and noble talent. From the provinces of Liang and Yi, he would seek those with ability. Chen Shou, Yan Yi (閻乂) and Fei Li were all famous scholars from the western lands yet were slandered by the villagers of their countrysides for more than 10 years. He Pan cleared away those rumors and repaired their reputations. Although he hold a major office, his family lived in extreme poverty. He Pan didn't have any concubines or female dancers and singers. He only saw helping the poor as an important affair. His son, He Zhang resembled him.

== See also ==
- Lists of people of the Three Kingdoms
