= Dushu (town) =

Dushu 独树镇
- Town
- Interactive map of Dushu
- Coordinates: 33°19′24″N 113°09′46″E
- Country: China
- Province: Henan
- Time zone: UTC+8

Dushu Town is a township-level administrative unit under the jurisdiction of Fangcheng County, Nanyang City, Henan Province, the People's Republic of China. Administrative division code: 41 13 22 101

== Yingcai Boarding School fire ==
The Yingcai Boarding School fire on January 19, 2024, in Yanshanpu Village, Dushu Town, killed at least 13 people and injured 1 others.

== Administrative divisions ==
Dushu has jurisdiction over 44 areas:

- Zhuyuan Village
- Pingyuan Village
- Zhaodong Village
- Zhaoxi Village
- Changzhuang Village
- Kangzhuang Village
- Zhugou Village
- Zhangzhai Village
- Liyuan Village
- Yaozhuang Village
- Banjing Village
- Zhouzhuang Village
- Wujing Village
- Mayan Village
- Sunwa Village
- Hanzhuang Village
- Dudong Village
- Sanlibao Village
- Duxi Village
- Dubei Village
- Chenzhuang Village
- Liwa Village
- Zhang Zhuang Village
- Xingyuan Village
- Baishizui Village
- Magang Village
- Zhongxinzhuang Village
- Wanggang Village
- Daigang Village
- Yanzhuang Village
- Liuying Village
- Tangshuyang Village
- Niujiaoli Village
- Jiaozhuang Village
- Xinzhuang Village
- Tangzhuang Village
- Diagutian Village
- Xiaojie Village
- Yanshanpu Village
- Jinyindian Village
- Qianzhuang Village
- Makuzhuang Village
- Shixiangli Village
- Huangzhuang Village
