= Zhijiang High School =

- 枝江中学

Location
- Jiang Han Road; Zhijiang, Hubei; China

Information
- Type: Public
- Established: March 5, 1949
- Nickname: 枝江一中
- Website: web.archive.org/web/20100801070702/http://www.hbzjzx.com (archive)

Zhijiang High School (Chinese: 枝江中学) is also called Zhijiang No.1 High School. It is a high school for senior students in Zhijiang, Hubei, China.

== History ==
The School was founded in 1965.

In 2005, Zhijiang High School built up a new school campus in Jiang Han Road. The area of new campus is about 319.2 mus. The total cost is around 90 million RMB. Currently there are more than 4000 students and teaching staff in the school.

== Associations and Clubs ==
XiaoFan literature club
