= NATO Washington Summit Declaration =

Declaration of NATO policies for Ukraine and Indo-Pacific

The NATO Washington Summit Declaration is a statement approved by all 32 member states of the North Atlantic Treaty Organization (NATO) that was issued on 10 July 2024 by the national leaders that participated in the NATO 2024 Washington summit in Washington, D.C., in the United States. The declaration made frequent references to Russia's invasion of Ukraine, specifically dedicating six paragraphs assuring assistance to Ukraine for defense and security against Russia's impact on European stability. The Declaration was notable for its overt use of strong language condemning China's support of Russia during its invasion, referring to it as a "decisive enabler" of Russia's war crimes and breaches of international law by strengthening their mutual economic trade and political partnership. It also included several means of support and coordination with different NATO facilities and initiatives to promote Ukraine's security on its "irreversible path" to integration with European and Western nations, including eventual NATO accession.

== Contents ==
The Declaration consists of 44 paragraphs, with six paragraphs stating NATO's pledge to assist Ukraine in its sovereignty and national security. It opens by reaffirming the organization's core missions to preserve peace and strengthen transatlantic security as a defensive alliance by protecting its members in a "360-degree approach" under the "iron-clad" Article 5, while upholding democratic values and human rights. The Declaration welcomed Sweden as NATO's 32nd member, following Finland's accession, noting that the expansion aimed to increase security in the High North and the Baltic Sea. NATO reaffirmed its Open Door Policy, which allows nations to choose their own security arrangements. Paragraph 6 commended the two-thirds of states that matched or exceeded the annual 2% of GDP defense spending goal, and celebrated efforts to modernize weapons and military activities. It noted that the increasing instability in the world in addition to accumulated deficits in certain areas of defense would demand an annual financing goal greater than 2% of GDP.

The Declaration noted that conflicts and instability in Africa and the Middle East impacted transatlantic security by contributing to forced displacement and irregular migration, designating a Special Representative to the region. NATO planned more meetings with Japan, South Korea, Australia, and New Zealand to improve cooperation against security threats in the Indo-Pacific region.

Notably, the Declaration did not include a reference to Georgia as a partner country or possible candidate for accession unlike Moldova and Bosnia and Herzegovina, both mentioned in paragraph 28. This followed Georgia's implementation of a bill designed to force non-government organizations and media receiving greater than 20% of their funding from abroad to register as foreign agents, as well as a bill in parliament that would codify issuing fines and punishment for LGBTQ+ "propaganda", both of which have caused bilateral relations to deteriorate.

Additional initiatives planned by NATO included integrating climate change considerations, "Women, Peace and Security (WPS)", and "Human Security" agendas into all core tasks, and implementing its new "Artificial intelligence Strategy" and new "Quantum and Biotechnology Strategies".

=== Russian invasion of Ukraine ===
NATO reaffirmed its support for Ukraine during the meeting of the NATO–Ukraine Council, emphasizing solidarity with Ukraine in its defense against Russian aggression with commitments from allies to provide Ukraine with additional air defense systems and military capabilities.

The Declaration strongly condemned Russia's invasion of Ukraine as a significant disruption to Euro-Atlantic stability and global security, with NATO classifying Russia as a primary threat to security. It called Russia the solely responsible party in its violations of international law to begin a war of aggression, deeming Russian forces and officials responsible for numerous war crimes, violations of human rights, and civilian deaths, making an implicit reference to Russia's bombing of the Okhmatdyt children's hospital in Kyiv. NATO refused to ever recognize Russia's annexations, including Crimea, and demanded that they remove their military forces from Moldova and Georgia. NATO stated that it does not want to attack Russia and will keep communication open despite Russia's military expansion, airspace violations, and "provocative activities" which included stationing nuclear weapons in Belarus. It also decried Russia's use of hybrid warfare, which included proxy wars, "instrumentalisation of irregular migration, malicious cyber activities, electronic interference, disinformation campaigns and malign political influence, as well as economic coercion" to destabilize NATO allies.

==== Declared enablers of war ====
The Declaration named the Democratic People's Republic of Korea (DPRK) and Iran as promoters of the war through ammunition and drone exports, while also naming Belarus due to its increasing military and infrastructure integration with Russia. Additionally, The Declaration cited Iran's "destabilizing actions", the PRC's "ambitions and coercive policies", and the strengthening Russia-PRC partnership as a strong threat to undermine the "rules-based international order".

The declaration specifically classified China as a "decisive enabler" of the Russian invasion due to its strengthening "no-limits" partnership and supplying Russia several dual-use materials that include raw materials and components of weapons. It stated that China's enabling of "the largest war in Europe in recent history" and its persistent employment of "malicious cyber and hybrid activities", "coercive tactics", disinformation, and "concerning" space and nuclear developments would cause significant consequences for its reputation. The statement was the first overt mention of China as a direct party in the Russian invasion of Ukraine by NATO.

==== Actions ====
Key initiatives established by NATO included the NATO Security Assistance and Training for Ukraine (NSATU) to coordinate military aid and training, and the NATO-Ukraine Joint Analysis, Training, and Education Centre (JATEC) to enhance operations between different units, and to promote learning from the conflict. NATO also announced a long-term security assistance pledge of €40 billion delivered proportionally between nations, and appointed a Senior Representative in Ukraine, further supporting Ukraine's path toward NATO membership as long as they kept passing reforms to enhance security and democratic values.

Paragraph 7 reported that NATO had deployed combat-ready forces on NATO's Eastern border facing Russia and Belarus to accelerate the rate at which military operations can be conducted. NATO stated that modernizing communication, taking advantage of Finland and Sweden's accessions, and integrating space into more plans and exercises would also increase the possible rate of deployment. It also noted the establishment of the NATO Integrated Cyber Defense Centre to further improve communication and increase network security. It mentioned further investments in NATO's "Chemical, Biological, Radiological and Nuclear defense capabilities". Paragraph 8 explained the implementation of the Integrated Air and Missile Defence (IAMD) Rotational Model on NATO's Eastern Flank in Poland and declaring the development of NATO Ballistic Missile Defence (BMD) Enhanced Operational Capability to enhance air defense.

== Reactions ==
Chinese officials denied that they supported Russia's invasion of Ukraine, claiming that their relationship was centered primarily around economic trade. The Chinese Foreign Ministry accused NATO of trying to demean China as an excuse to take a more active role in Asia-Pacific relations and conflicts, and defended China as a "force for world peace" aiding global development and upholding international order.

Foreign Minister of Poland Radek Sikorski stated that he would be satisfied with the strong language used in the declaration "when we win the war", and hoped that Ukraine would be able to enter NATO.

President of South Korea Yoon Suk Yeol and Prime Minister of Japan Fumio Kishida both praised the declaration's focus on cooperating with their nations to enhance security in conflicts with China, and corroborated the declaration's worry towards North Korea and Russia's military and economic partnership for East Asian and global stability. Both nations vowed to cooperate with each other while working with NATO, with Kishida calling Japan's and South Korea's security "inseparable".

Al Jazeera journalist Mike Hanna remarked that there was a "conspicuous" lack of mentions of Gaza or Palestine in the statement regarding the Gaza war and Gaza humanitarian crisis, and a lack of discussion about these situations at the summit in general. He mentioned this with regard to the U.S. President Joe Biden administration's resumption of 500-pound bomb shipments to Israel following a pause in May 2024 due to worries of civilian casualties.

Foreign Minister of Hungary Péter Szijjártó expressed concern over the Declaration's use of harsh language towards China, stating that he wanted NATO to remain a defensive alliance and not "an anti-China bloc". He also believed that the Declaration's programs to bring Ukraine closer to NATO would weaken the alliance instead of strengthening it due to there being strongly contrasting perspectives towards its potential accession, as well as by potentially pushing NATO into direct military actions towards Russia.

== See also ==
- Ukraine–NATO relations
- 2024 Washington summit
- NATO–Ukraine Council
- Ukraine Defense Contact Group
