= He Sui (Shu Han) =

Shu Han official and scholar (214-284)

- 何隨

Administrator of Jiangyang (江陽太守)
- In office ? – 284
- Monarch: Sima Yan

Prefect of Anhan (安漢令)
- In office ? – 263
- Monarch: Liu Shan

Main Adviser (主事)
- In office ?–?
- Monarch: Liu Shan

Assistant Officer (從事)
- In office ?–?
- Monarch: Liu Shan

Officer of Merit (功曹)
- In office ?–?
- Monarch: Liu Shan

Personal details
- Born: 214; Pi County, Sichuan
- Died: 284 (aged 70); Jiangyang District, Sichuan
- Relations: He Wu (ancestor); He Zong (grandfather); He Pan (relative)
- Children: He Guan; He You
- Parent: He Shuang (father)
- Occupation: Official, scholar
- Courtesy name: Jiye (季業)

He Sui (214–284), courtesy name Jiye, was an official and scholar of the state of Shu Han in the Three Kingdoms period of China. After the fall of Shu in 263, he continued serving under the Jin dynasty, that succeeded Cao Wei state in 266.

== Life ==
He Sui was born in Pi County, Shu Commandery (蜀郡), which is present-day Pi County, Sichuan, and was a descendant of the Han minister He Wu (何武). He came from a family with a reputation for virtue and was recruited to serve in the Shu Han government. He studied the Han shi waizhuan and Ouyang Gao (歐陽高)'s version of the Book of Documents, delving deeply into literature and mastering astronomy and the calendar systems. He served in his home commandery Shu as Officer of Merit (功曹), then for the State government as Assistant Officer (從事) and Main Adviser (主事; host and manage affairs) to the guanglu langzhong (光祿郎中; "Gentleman of the Household and Palace"). Furthermore, he was appointed as Prefect of Anhan (安漢令).

After the Conquest of Shu by Wei, he left his office. At that time, the Ba region suffered from a severe shortage of food, causing famine. As He Sui traveled, he would take yam from the fields to feed his entourage, leaving a piece of cotton behind as a way of payment. The locals, recognizing the cotton, would say: "We heard that He Sui, the Prefect of Anhan is an honest and upright man. He must have been passing by. His followers are short of food so he most likely had no other options." They would then return the cotton to He Sui, who consistently refused to accept it. As a result, a saying arose: "When the officials of Anhan take food, they make sure to compensate for it." He Sui was later nominated as a xiaolian (civil service candidate).

Following Cao Wei's abdication to Jin, He Sui was summoned by the imperial court but declined to attend. Again, he was appointed as the Director of the Palace (中令) to the Prince of Hejian (河間王), but refused the position. Living in poverty, he maintained a simple lifestyle, wearing worn out clothes and eating vegetarian meals. He spent his days working in the fields and his evenings teaching and reciting texts. He did not accept gifts or bribes from his fellow villagers or powerful clans. Neither was he swayed by personal interests. Moreover, he authored ten volumes of Tan Yan (譚言), a text discussing morality, benevolence, and humility.

As an example of his behaviour, one day, a butcher lost his pig when its leash broke. The butcher falsely accused He Sui of taking it. He Sui simply handed over another pig to the butcher without protest. When the butcher later found his lost pig, he apologized to He Sui and returned the pig, which He Sui then accepted. Another anecdote. He Sui had a bamboo garden at his home and someone once stole bamboo shoots from it. When He Sui happened upon the thief, he was afraid that the thief would be frightened and injure himself trying to escape so He Sui quietly left the scene. Such was his benevolence. During the Taikang (太康; 280–289 period), He Sui was appointed as the Administrator of Jiangyang (江陽太守) from his current home and the people longed for his rule. He died while serving in office at the age of 71 (by East Asian age reckoning).

After his death, people in the township of Houzhou (後州) referred to any fair and just person as "He of Jiangyang" (何江陽). Even the indigenous people of Wenshan (汶山), who were known for their integrity and humility, were also called "He of Jiangyang" (何江陽) by other tribes. Du Jingwen (杜景文) and He Xingren (何興仁) both wrote biographies about He Sui. Around the same time as He Sui, Zhang Chong (張崇), born from the same commandery of Shu, was well known among his contemporaries for his incorruptible character.

== Appraisal ==
Chang Qu, who wrote He Sui's biography in the Chronicles of Huayang (Huayang Guo Zhi), (Note: He Sui's biography is recorded in the eleventh volume of the Huayang Guo Zhi, titled Biographies of later worthies (後賢志), covering the life of notable persons from the Sichuan region who lived during the Jin dynasty.) appraised He Sui as follows: "Bright official, honest and pure of his generation."

== He Guan ==
He Guan (何觀), whose courtesy name was Juzhong (巨忠), was He Sui's eldest son. He was a man of integrity and prudence, well-known in the region. He was nominated as a xiaolian (civil service candidate), served as Prefect (令) of Xidu (西都) and Nan'an (南安), and Chief Clerk (長史) of Pinxi (平西). In 303, Zhang Chang (Jin dynasty) rebelled in Jing, causing much turmoil in the province. All the local defenders reunited at Jiangyang (江陽). Luo Shang appointed him as Protector of the Army (護軍) and received his help to quell the rebellion. Furthermore, he served as Administrator of Ba Commandery (巴郡太守). The imperial court planned to appoint him as the Inspector of Ningzhou (寧州刺史). (Note: Nanzhong was also called Ningzhou or Ning Province (寧州).) But he fell ill and died before assuming the position. His younger brother, He You (何遊), served as Headquarters Officer (治中從事).

== See also ==
- Lists of people of the Three Kingdoms
