= Yingcai Boarding School fire =

School fire disaster in China

- Image showing the fire
- Date: 19 January 2024
- Location: Yincai Boarding School, in Dushu, Henan, China
- Deaths: 13
- Injuries: 1

On 19 January 2024, a fire broke out in the dormitory of a primary boarding school in Dushu, in the Henan province of central China, resulting in one injury and the deaths of at least 13 third-grade students between nine and ten years old. Approximately 30 students lived in the dormitory. The cause of the fire is under investigation.

== Background ==
=== Common incidents ===
Due to low safety standards and poor enforcement, building fires and similar deadly incidents are common in China. Recent examples are the 2023 Beijing hospital fire, 2023 Qiqihar school gymnasium collapse and 2023 Yinchuan gas explosion. After the Luliang building fire on 16 November 2023 where 26 people were killed, CCP General Secretary Xi Jinping already called to "conduct in-depth investigations of hidden risks in key industries, improve emergency plans and prevention measures".

=== Yingcai Boarding School ===
The Yingcai School is located in Dushu, of Fangcheng County, on the outskirts of Nanyang, a city of almost 10 million people. It was established in June 2012, with a registered capital of 1.07 million yuan. The dormitory room that caught fire had around 30 children, primarily from nearby rural areas. The school also had left-behind children. Girls lived on the second floor of the dormitory and the boys on the third floor.

== Fire ==
The fire department received the call about the fire at 10:40 pm. The fire was extinguished at 11:38 pm. Images showed charred windows on the third floor.

Domestic media initially stated the fire was possibly due to an electric heating device.

== Casualties ==
Approximately 30 students lived in the dormitory. Thirteen 9- and 10-year-old third grade children were killed. They were from 13 different families. One person was severely injured and brought to hospital. All of the dead and injured were boys; the remaining students were safely evacuated.

== Aftermath ==
A team was sent to assist with rescue operations and to help during the aftermath. The community, local authorities and the management of the school urged in ensuring the safety of the children who survived and to unite in supporting the involved families. Local officials had a meeting to discuss the follow-up work and how to improve future safety measures.

Because all windows throughout the dormitory are covered with guard rails, concerns about the safety measures of the school were raised.

The Ministry of Emergency Management expressed their commitment to preventing tragedies like this one. They urged to check hidden fire risks in densely populated areas. Outrage about the fire was posted by numerous Chinese people on social media. They expressed that they want any safety lapses to be punished. Multiple cities including Luohe in Henan, Yichun in Jiangxi province, Panjin in Liaoning province, and Xi'an in Shaanxi province, issued statements to conduct fire safety inspections and rectification work in buildings like schools, hospitals, nursing homes, shopping malls, hotels and staff dormitories.

The day after the fire, shops around the school were mostly shuttered.

== Investigation ==
Local authorities and leaders from Henan province and the city of Nanyang immediately closed down the school and started "a comprehensive investigation" into the cause of the fire. The director of the school was initially arrested. Initial domestic media reports indicated the fire was caused by an electric heating device.

As of 21 January 2024, the investigation is still ongoing. Police surveillance was increased and the school was sealed off. Authorities said that one person in charge of the school was detained for questioning.

== See also ==
- List of fires in China
- List of building or structure fires
