= Zhenyuan County, Gansu =

Zhenyuan County 镇原县 Chenyuan
- County
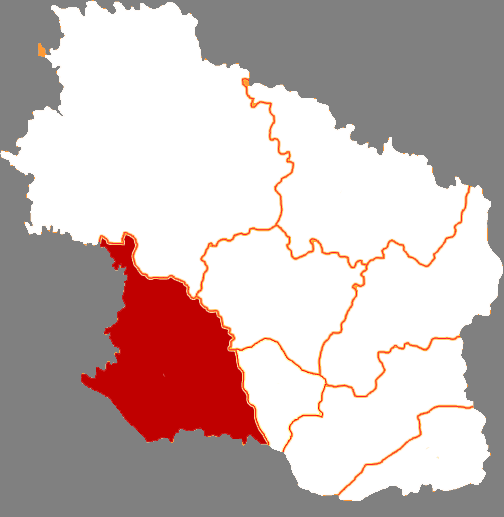
- Zhenyuan in Qingyang

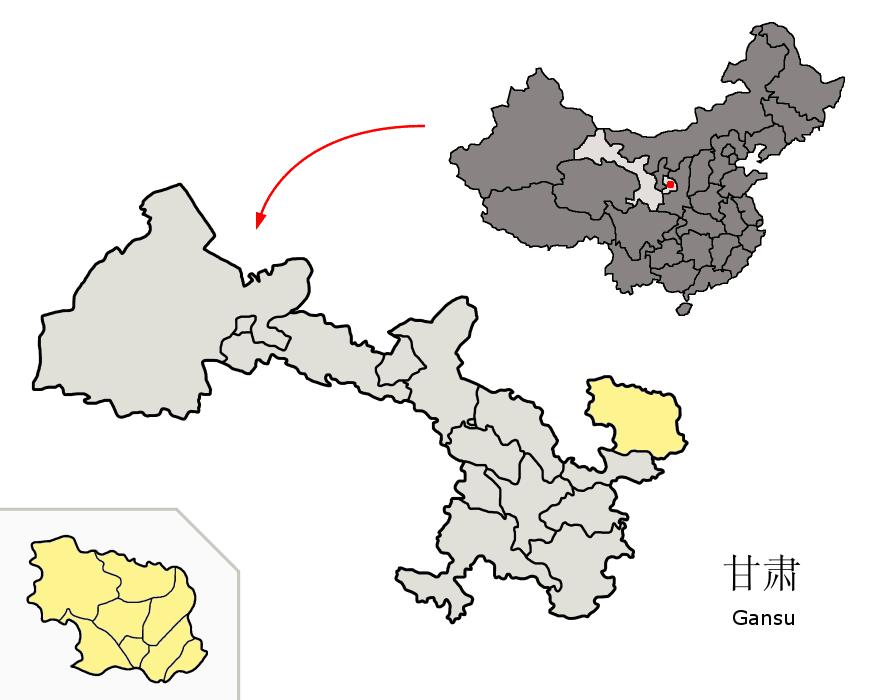
- Qingyang in Gansu
- Coordinates: 35°40′39″N 107°12′03″E
- Country: China
- Province: Gansu
- Prefecture-level city: Qingyang
- County seat: Chengguan

Area
  - Total: 3,500 km^{2} (1,400 sq mi)
- Elevation: 1,500 m (4,900 ft)
- Highest elevation: 1,767 m (5,797 ft)
- Lowest elevation: 1,011 m (3,317 ft)

Population (2018)
  - Total: 528,076
  - Density: 150/km^{2} (390/sq mi)
- Time zone: UTC+8 (China Standard)
- Postal code: 744500

Zhenyuan County (simplified Chinese: 镇原县; traditional Chinese: 鎮原縣; pinyin: Zhènyuán Xiàn) is a county in the east of Gansu province, China, bordering Ningxia to the west. It is under the administration of the prefecture-level city of Qingyang. Its postal code is 744500, and its population in 2018 was 528,076 people.

One of the earliest Paleolithic sites in China, Dongdonggou, was found in Zhenyuan. In the Han dynasty it was established as Linjing County, during the Yuan dynasty it was named Yuanzhou, and during the Ming dynasty it became Zhenyuan County.

Zhenyuan is mostly dependent on cultivation of grains, vegetable oils, melons and vegetables. It also has oil reserves.

In October 2019, the Zhenyuan County Library posted images of book burning of 65 books from the library. The post attracted significant controversy on Chinese social media.

== Administrative divisions ==
Zhenyuan County is divided to 13 towns and 6 townships.

Towns

- Chengguan (城关镇)
- Tunzi (屯字镇)
- Mengba (孟坝镇)
- Sancha (三岔镇)
- Pingquan (平泉镇)
- Kaibian (开边镇)
- Taiping (太平镇)
- Linjing (临泾镇)
- Xincheng (新城镇)
- Shangxiao (上肖镇)
- Xinji (新集镇)
- Maqu (马渠镇)
- Miaoqu (庙渠镇)

Townships

- Nanchuan Township (南川乡)
- Fangshan Township (方山乡)
- Yinjiacheng Township (殷家城乡)
- Wugou Township (武沟乡)
- Guoyuan Township (郭原乡)
- Zhongyuan Township (中原乡)

== Climate ==
Climate data for Zhenyuan, elevation 1,173 m (3,848 ft), (1991–2020 normals, extremes 1981–2010)
| Month | Jan | Feb | Mar | Apr | May | Jun | Jul | Aug | Sep | Oct | Nov | Dec | Year |
|---|---|---|---|---|---|---|---|---|---|---|---|---|---|
| Record high °C (°F) | 15.0 (59.0) | 22.9 (73.2) | 28.5 (83.3) | 33.4 (92.1) | 34.6 (94.3) | 37.4 (99.3) | 38.3 (100.9) | 35.5 (95.9) | 36.0 (96.8) | 29.0 (84.2) | 22.0 (71.6) | 18.0 (64.4) | 38.3 (100.9) |
| Mean daily maximum °C (°F) | 3.0 (37.4) | 6.7 (44.1) | 12.9 (55.2) | 19.8 (67.6) | 24.1 (75.4) | 28.1 (82.6) | 29.3 (84.7) | 27.4 (81.3) | 22.2 (72.0) | 16.4 (61.5) | 10.5 (50.9) | 4.7 (40.5) | 17.1 (62.8) |
| Daily mean °C (°F) | −4.2 (24.4) | −0.2 (31.6) | 5.8 (42.4) | 12.4 (54.3) | 16.9 (62.4) | 21.2 (70.2) | 23.2 (73.8) | 21.6 (70.9) | 16.4 (61.5) | 10.0 (50.0) | 3.3 (37.9) | −2.5 (27.5) | 10.3 (50.6) |
| Mean daily minimum °C (°F) | −9.0 (15.8) | −5.1 (22.8) | 0.3 (32.5) | 5.9 (42.6) | 10.4 (50.7) | 14.9 (58.8) | 18.0 (64.4) | 17.0 (62.6) | 12.2 (54.0) | 5.6 (42.1) | −1.4 (29.5) | −7.1 (19.2) | 5.1 (41.3) |
| Record low °C (°F) | −19.7 (−3.5) | −18.5 (−1.3) | −12.4 (9.7) | −5.3 (22.5) | −1.2 (29.8) | 6.8 (44.2) | 10.4 (50.7) | 6.9 (44.4) | 1.8 (35.2) | −7.5 (18.5) | −15.1 (4.8) | −23.3 (−9.9) | −23.3 (−9.9) |
| Average precipitation mm (inches) | 4.5 (0.18) | 6.6 (0.26) | 14.7 (0.58) | 28.8 (1.13) | 43.5 (1.71) | 60.0 (2.36) | 93.6 (3.69) | 96.6 (3.80) | 75.1 (2.96) | 40.1 (1.58) | 12.1 (0.48) | 2.2 (0.09) | 477.8 (18.82) |
| Average precipitation days (≥ 0.1 mm) | 3.4 | 4.4 | 6.0 | 6.5 | 8.0 | 9.6 | 11.4 | 11.1 | 11.6 | 8.5 | 4.6 | 2.1 | 87.2 |
| Average snowy days | 5.8 | 5.6 | 3.7 | 0.7 | 0 | 0 | 0 | 0 | 0 | 0.5 | 3.0 | 4.0 | 23.3 |
| Average relative humidity (%) | 56 | 57 | 55 | 52 | 56 | 60 | 68 | 73 | 77 | 75 | 67 | 59 | 63 |
| Mean monthly sunshine hours | 193.3 | 171.0 | 200.4 | 224.9 | 241.2 | 236.6 | 227.0 | 203.8 | 153.4 | 168.4 | 182.3 | 198.5 | 2,400.8 |
| Percentage possible sunshine | 62 | 55 | 54 | 57 | 55 | 55 | 52 | 49 | 42 | 49 | 60 | 66 | 55 |
Source: China Meteorological Administration

== See also ==
- List of administrative divisions of Gansu
