= Fangcheng County =

Fangcheng County 方城县
- County
- Location of the seat in Henan
- Coordinates: 33°15′0″N 112°58′48″E
- Country: People's Republic of China
- Province: Henan
- Prefecture-level city: Nanyang

Area
  - Total: 2,542 km^{2} (981 sq mi)

Population (2019)
  - Total: 847,900
  - Density: 333.6/km^{2} (863.9/sq mi)
- Time zone: UTC+8 (China Standard)
- Postal code: 473200
- Area code: 0377
- Website: www.fangcheng.gov.cn

Fangcheng (Chinese: 方城; pinyin: Fāngchéng) is a county in the east of Nanyang City's administrative area, in the southwest of Henan province, China. It has an area of 2,542 km^{2} (981 sq mi) and a population of 970,000 as of 2002.

== Administrative divisions ==
As of 2012, this county is divided to 7 towns, 8 townships and 1 ethnic township.

Towns

- Chengguan (城关镇)
- Dushu (独树镇)
- Bowang (博望镇)
- Guaihe (拐河镇)
- Xiaoshidian (小史店镇)
- Zhaohe (赵河镇)
- Guangyang (广阳镇)

Townships

- Quanqiao Township (券桥乡)
- Yangji Township (杨集乡)
- Erlangmiao Township (二郎庙乡)
- Guzhuangdian Township (古庄店乡)
- Yanglou Township (杨楼乡)
- Qinghe Township (清河乡)
- Liuhe Township (柳河乡)
- Xilidian Township (四里店乡)

Ethnic townships

- Yuandian Hui Township (袁店回族乡)

== Climate ==
Climate data for Fangcheng, elevation 164 m (538 ft), (1991–2020 normals, extremes 1981–present)
Month	Jan	Feb	Mar	Apr	May	Jun	Jul	Aug	Sep	Oct	Nov	Dec	Year
Record high °C (°F)	19.0 (66.2)	22.4 (72.3)	31.6 (88.9)	33.2 (91.8)	38.7 (101.7)	38.9 (102.0)	40.6 (105.1)	39.0 (102.2)	38.2 (100.8)	33.0 (91.4)	26.9 (80.4)	20.2 (68.4)	40.6 (105.1)
Mean daily maximum °C (°F)	6.2 (43.2)	10.0 (50.0)	15.2 (59.4)	21.7 (71.1)	27.1 (80.8)	31.1 (88.0)	31.6 (88.9)	30.4 (86.7)	26.7 (80.1)	21.8 (71.2)	14.6 (58.3)	8.4 (47.1)	20.4 (68.7)
Daily mean °C (°F)	0.9 (33.6)	4.1 (39.4)	9.3 (48.7)	15.6 (60.1)	21.1 (70.0)	25.5 (77.9)	27.0 (80.6)	25.8 (78.4)	21.3 (70.3)	15.7 (60.3)	8.8 (47.8)	2.8 (37.0)	14.8 (58.7)
Mean daily minimum °C (°F)	−3.1 (26.4)	−0.5 (31.1)	4.4 (39.9)	10.1 (50.2)	15.5 (59.9)	20.4 (68.7)	23.3 (73.9)	22.2 (72.0)	17.2 (63.0)	11.1 (52.0)	4.4 (39.9)	−1.3 (29.7)	10.3 (50.6)
Record low °C (°F)	−13.1 (8.4)	−13.6 (7.5)	−7.3 (18.9)	−1.1 (30.0)	4.5 (40.1)	11.5 (52.7)	16.7 (62.1)	13.5 (56.3)	7.2 (45.0)	−2.2 (28.0)	−6.9 (19.6)	−17.8 (0.0)	−17.8 (0.0)
Average precipitation mm (inches)	10.7 (0.42)	13.9 (0.55)	30.3 (1.19)	45.5 (1.79)	78.1 (3.07)	116.6 (4.59)	194.6 (7.66)	161.6 (6.36)	79.3 (3.12)	47.1 (1.85)	32.2 (1.27)	10.6 (0.42)	820.5 (32.29)
Average precipitation days (≥ 0.1 mm)	4.5	5.2	6.8	7.0	8.4	9.3	11.4	11.0	9.5	7.4	6.2	4.7	91.4
Average snowy days	5.0	4.0	1.5	0.1	0	0	0	0	0	0	1.2	2.8	14.6
Average relative humidity (%)	68	67	68	69	68	70	80	82	78	73	73	69	72
Mean monthly sunshine hours	115.0	119.9	157.0	183.4	192.7	179.6	175.8	177.4	147.0	144.5	131.7	125.6	1,849.6
Percentage possible sunshine	36	38	42	47	45	42	40	43	40	42	43	41	42
Source: China Meteorological Administration
