= Zhijiang, Hubei =

Zhijiang 枝江市 Chihkiang
- County-level city
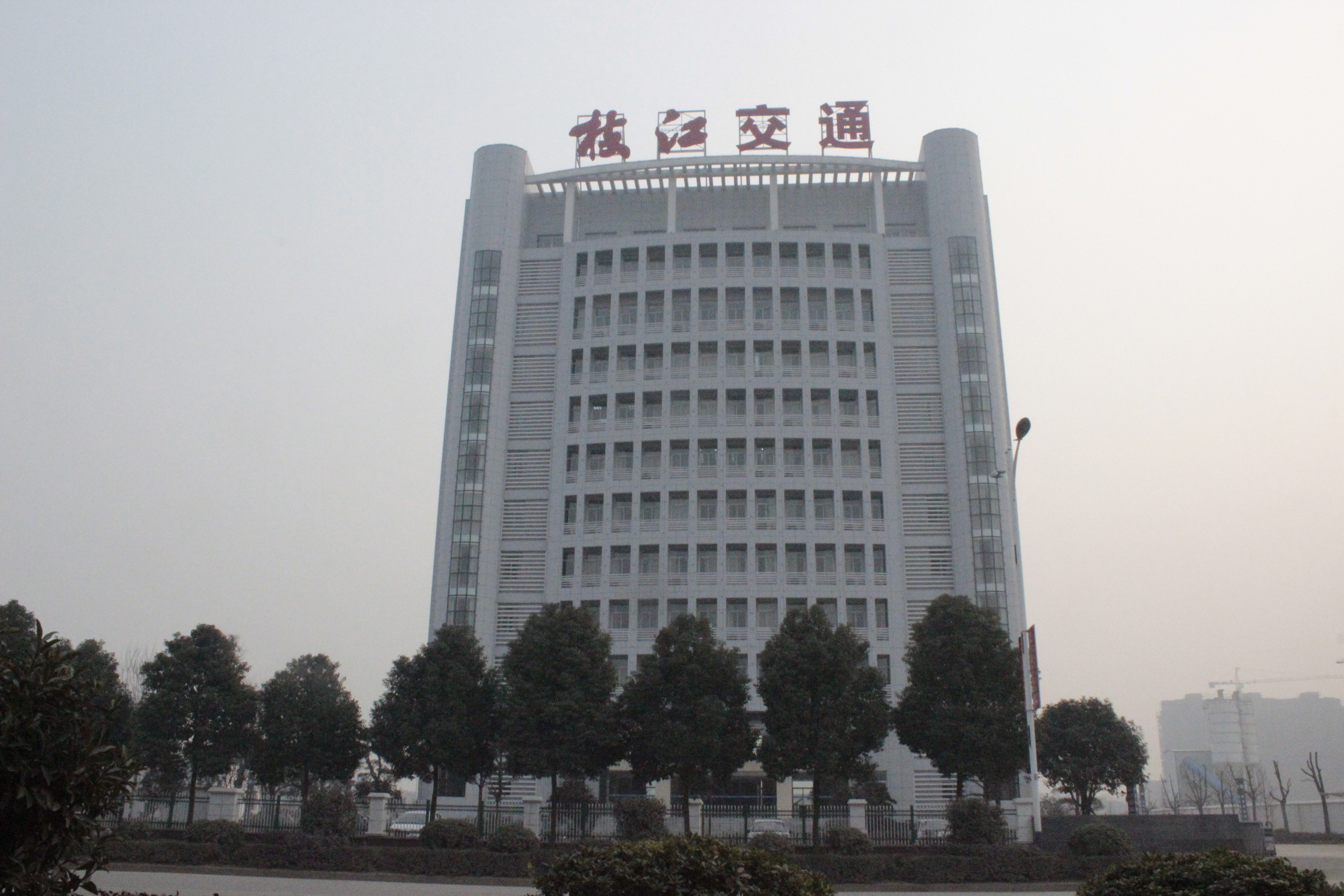
- Zhijiang Transportation Bureau

- Location in Hubei
- Coordinates: 30°25′34″N 111°45′40″E
- Country: People's Republic of China
- Province: Hubei
- Prefecture-level city: Yichang

Area
  - County-level city: 1,310 km^{2} (510 sq mi)
  - Urban: 100.00 km^{2} (38.61 sq mi)

Population (2020)
  - County-level city: 408,487
  - Density: 312/km^{2} (808/sq mi)
  - Urban: 243,784
- Time zone: UTC+8 (China Standard)

Zhijiang
- Chinese: 枝江
- Postal: Chihkiang
Transcriptions
Standard Mandarin
- Hanyu Pinyin: Zhījiāng
- Wade–Giles: Chih^{1}-chiang^{1}

Zhijiang (Chinese: 枝江; pinyin: Zhījiāng) is a county-level city of Yichang City, in the west of Hubei province, People's Republic of China. Until the 1990s Zhijiang was a county. It is located on the left (northern) shore of the Yangtze River, downstream from Yichang center city.

== Administrative divisions ==
One subdistrict:

- Majiadian Subdistrict (马家店街道)

Eight towns:

- Anfusi (安福寺镇), Baiyang (白洋镇), Gujiadian (顾家店镇), Dongshi (董市镇), Xiannü (仙女镇), Wen'an (问安镇), Qixingtai (七星台镇), Bailizhou (百里洲镇)

== Climate ==
Zhijiang has a humid subtropical climate (Köppen climate classification Cfa) with hot, rainy summers and cool winters. Rainfall occurs throughout the year but is significantly heavier between April and August.

Climate data for Zhijiang, elevation 66 m (217 ft), (1991–2020 normals, extremes 1991–present)
Month	Jan	Feb	Mar	Apr	May	Jun	Jul	Aug	Sep	Oct	Nov	Dec	Year
Record high °C (°F)	21.2 (70.2)	27.1 (80.8)	31.5 (88.7)	35.0 (95.0)	37.9 (100.2)	38.7 (101.7)	39.4 (102.9)	38.7 (101.7)	40.1 (104.2)	34.7 (94.5)	29.7 (85.5)	22.4 (72.3)	40.1 (104.2)
Mean daily maximum °C (°F)	8.3 (46.9)	11.3 (52.3)	16.2 (61.2)	22.3 (72.1)	27.1 (80.8)	30.1 (86.2)	32.4 (90.3)	32.2 (90.0)	28.3 (82.9)	22.9 (73.2)	16.7 (62.1)	10.8 (51.4)	21.5 (70.8)
Daily mean °C (°F)	4.8 (40.6)	7.4 (45.3)	11.7 (53.1)	17.6 (63.7)	22.4 (72.3)	26.0 (78.8)	28.3 (82.9)	28.0 (82.4)	23.9 (75.0)	18.5 (65.3)	12.5 (54.5)	7.0 (44.6)	17.3 (63.2)
Mean daily minimum °C (°F)	2.1 (35.8)	4.2 (39.6)	8.3 (46.9)	13.9 (57.0)	18.8 (65.8)	22.7 (72.9)	25.2 (77.4)	24.9 (76.8)	20.7 (69.3)	15.3 (59.5)	9.4 (48.9)	4.0 (39.2)	14.1 (57.4)
Record low °C (°F)	−5.8 (21.6)	−4.0 (24.8)	−1.1 (30.0)	3.8 (38.8)	10.3 (50.5)	16.2 (61.2)	19.0 (66.2)	16.2 (61.2)	11.6 (52.9)	6.5 (43.7)	−0.6 (30.9)	−7.2 (19.0)	−7.2 (19.0)
Average precipitation mm (inches)	30.3 (1.19)	39.6 (1.56)	60.7 (2.39)	108.6 (4.28)	134.9 (5.31)	156.4 (6.16)	197.7 (7.78)	124.2 (4.89)	78.8 (3.10)	71.3 (2.81)	46.6 (1.83)	20.2 (0.80)	1,069.3 (42.1)
Average precipitation days (≥ 0.1 mm)	8.0	8.9	11.7	12.4	12.9	12.5	12.0	10.1	8.9	9.8	9.4	7.0	123.6
Average snowy days	4.3	2.9	0.8	0	0	0	0	0	0	0	0.3	1.5	9.8
Average relative humidity (%)	74	73	75	76	74	78	80	78	74	74	75	72	75
Mean monthly sunshine hours	79.5	84.7	120.1	139.7	148.6	146.7	190.6	201.8	145.8	129.2	112.5	96.9	1,596.1
Percentage possible sunshine	25	27	32	36	35	35	45	50	40	37	36	31	36
Source: China Meteorological Administrationall-time extreme temperature

== Education ==
- Zhijiang High School

== Transport ==
- China National Highway 318
- Yichang Sanxia Airport
- Jiaozuo–Liuzhou Railway

== Economy ==
Zhijiang City has a significant cluster of Taobao villages, rural Chinese villages where the local economy has developed to focus extensively on e-commerce via the Taobao retail shopping platform. As of September 2019, there are more than 1,000 e-commerce enterprises in Zhijiang City, more than 8,000 e-commerce online stores, and more than 20,000 people working in e-commerce.

== Lü Banglie ==
In October 2005, Zhijiang was in the news because one of the delegates to its (county-level) People's Congress, Lu Banglie (吕邦列), a village-rights activist, was savagely beaten on October 8, 2005 in the village of Taishi (太石), in Yuwotou town, Panyu District, Guangzhou, Guangdong, by unknown persons. The beating was witnessed by Benjamin Joffe-Walt, correspondent for The Guardian newspaper of the UK, who was himself threatened and believed Lü had been killed.

Since 2004, Lü has been the popularly elected head of Baoyuesi village (宝月寺村; 30°20′31″N 111°41′01″E), in the town of Bailizhou (百里洲镇), situated on a peninsula in the Yangtze River and the only town in Zhijiang not on the river's left bank; there is no road connection between Bailizhou and the city's other towns. He is the first elected village head in the history of the People's Republic of China.

The beating may have been intended to prevent a similar popular election from taking place in Taishi.
