= Sharswood, Philadelphia =

Sharswood
- Neighborhood of Philadelphia
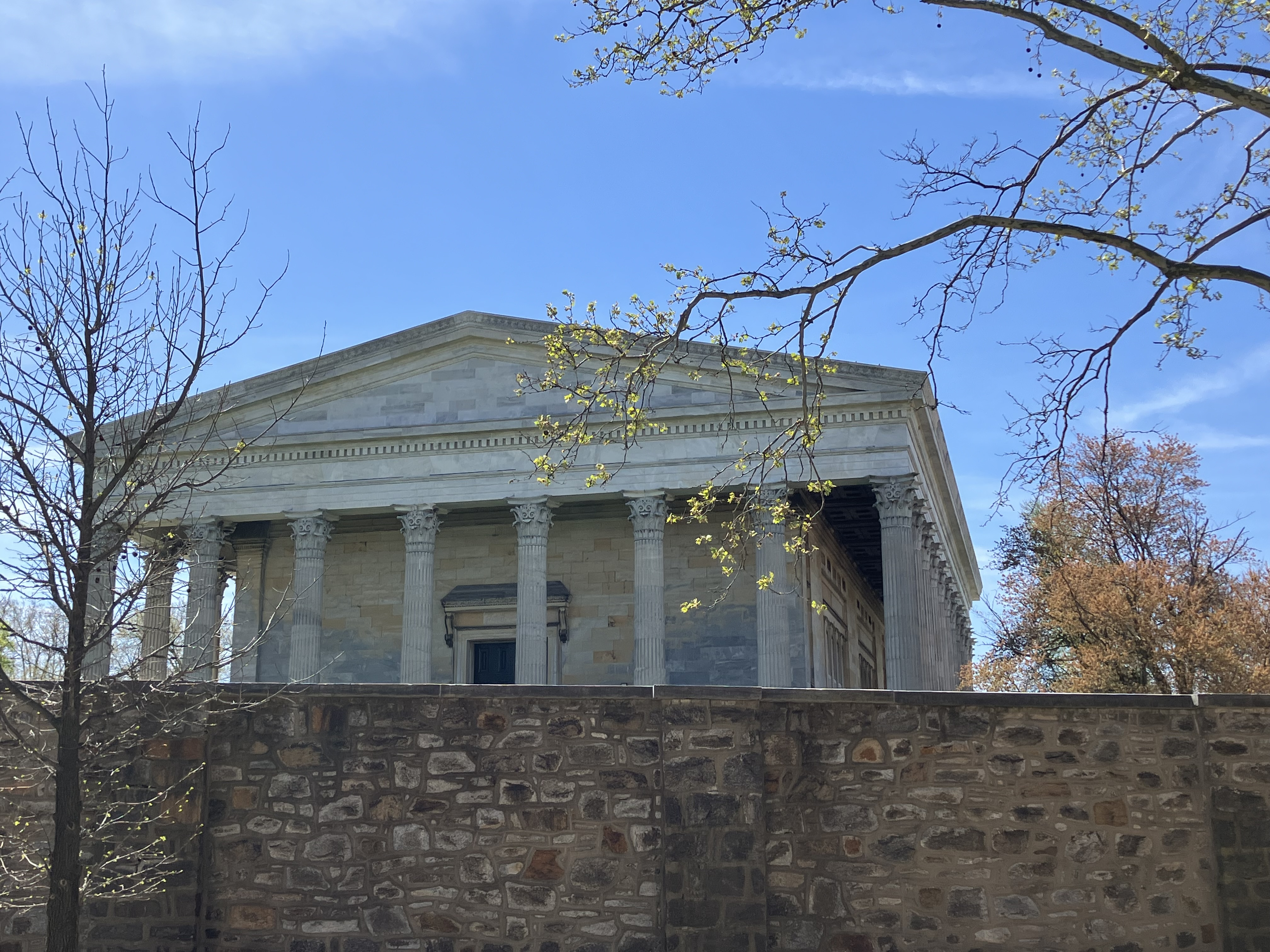
- Girard College as seen from Sharswood's southern border.

- Location within Philadelphia
- Country: United States
- State: Pennsylvania
- County: Philadelphia
- City: Philadelphia
- Area codes: 215, 267 and 445

Sharswood is a small neighborhood in the North Philadelphia section of the city of Philadelphia, Pennsylvania in the United States. It is located to the east of Brewerytown, north of Girard College, west of Ridge Avenue, east of 24th Street and south of Cecil B. Moore Avenue. It is often grouped with Brewerytown, as in the Brewerytown-Sharswood Community Civic Association, and the Brewerytown-Sharswood NTI Planning Area.

== History ==
In Philadelphia's earliest years, Sharswood had not yet developed as a neighborhood and was part of a larger area of farmland known as the Penn District. Ridge Avenue, which makes up Sharswood's eastern border, was a Lenape trail prior to European settlement.

Sharswood gets its name from Supreme Court of Pennsylvania justice George Sharswood, who once lived in the area. The area was first developed in the 19th century as a streetcar suburb and a home for Irish and German brewery workers who found employment along the banks of the Schuylkill River. The west side of Sharswood was once known as Engelside, because of the Bergner & Engel brewery at 32nd and Thompson Street.

Sharswood took shape as a predominantly African-American neighborhood in the early 20th century, when it experienced population inflows during the Great Migration. A number of notable African-American artists lived in Sharswood, including James B. Davis of The Dixie Hummingbirds and Dox Thrash. Many more artists including Charlie Parker, John Coltrane and Odean Pope frequented the area around Ridge and Columbia Avenue, known for its jazz clubs and nightlife, when visiting or touring in Philadelphia. The Negro Motorist Green Book recommended a number of hotels, restaurants and other establishments in the neighborhood. African-American leaders like Cecil B. Moore and Charles W. Bowser lived in and around the neighborhood.

Sharswood was racially segregated from surrounding white neighborhoods, and it was dangerous for Black residents of Sharswood to travel to neighborhoods like Swampoodle, north of Lehigh Ave, and Fairmount, south of Girard Ave. According to J.M. Brewer's 1934 map of Philadelphia and another map produced by the federal government's Home Owners' Loan Corporation, Sharswood was redlined. According to the area description form that accompanies the 1937 HOLC map of Philadelphia, Sharswood and its adjacent neighborhoods were populated primarily by laborers and mechanics making an average of $900 to $1800 annually ($19,190 to $38,381 in 2023 dollars), with a high number of families on public assistance and a homeownership rate below 10%. Longtime residents say that lawyers, doctors and teachers also lived in the neighborhood. Roberts Vaux Junior High School was built in the neighborhood between 1936 and 1938. Malcolm X briefly lived and worked at a house on the corner of 25th and W Oxford Street for about 6 months in 1954, while serving as the Nation of Islam's minister for Temple 12, located at 1643 North Bailey Street.

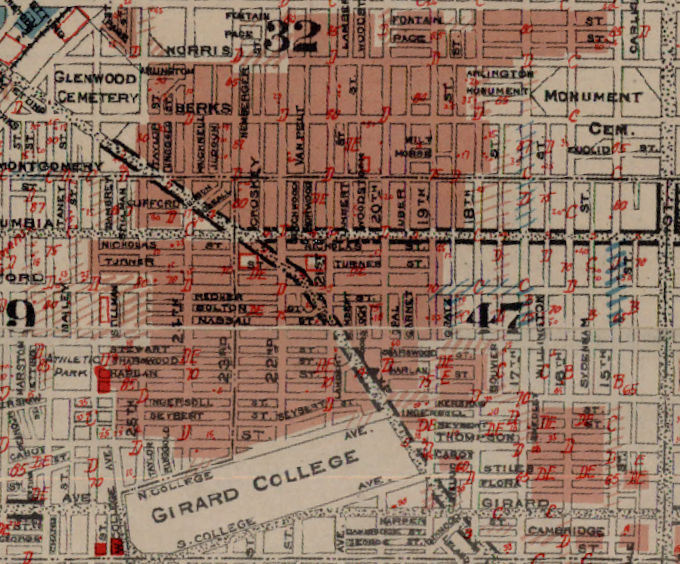
J.M. Brewer's 1934 map of Philadelphia, showing redlining in Sharswood

The 1964 Columbia Avenue Riot began just north of Sharswood, and spilled over into the neighborhood, devastating local businesses, exacerbating racial tensions and accelerating white flight. In 1967, construction on the Norman Blumberg Apartments was completed between 24th and 22nd, Jefferson, and W Oxford Streets. In 1968, the People's Neighborhood Medical Center opened on 1410 North 24th Street to provide low cost preventative healthcare to low income residents of North Philadelphia. The medical center was founded by Charles P. Vaclavik, a Quaker doctor from Uniontown, Pennsylvania. In the early 1970s, the medical center expanded and employed multiple doctors as well as a dentist. It attracted government funding through the Model Cities Program, as well as other grants. Under Vaclavik's leadership, the medical center took an active role in the community and advocated for addressing the social determinants of health in addition to the practice of medicine.

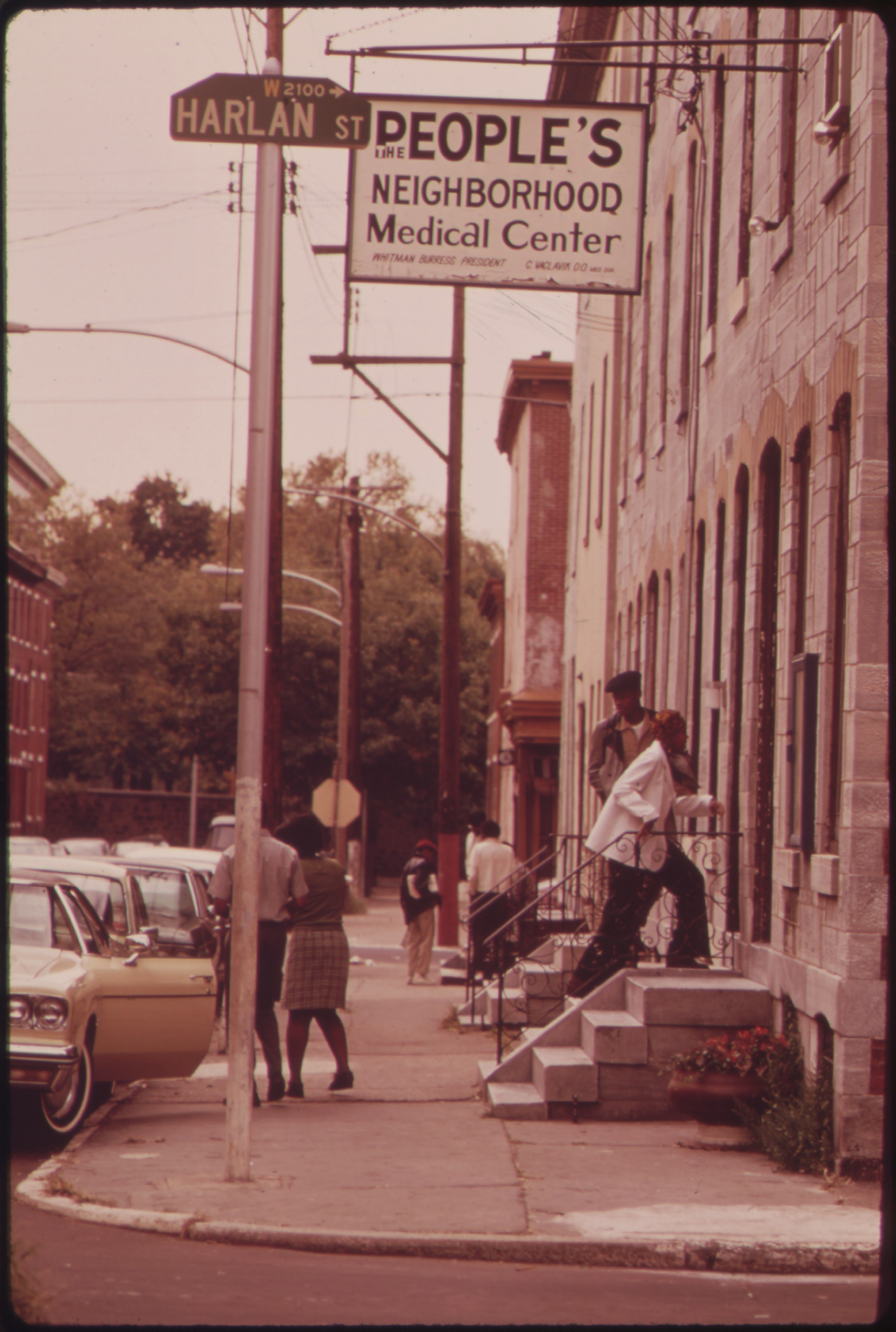
A medical center in Sharswood during the 1970s

In the later half of the 20th century, the neighborhood suffered from population decline, deindustrialization and disinvestment, becoming one of the poorest neighborhoods in Philadelphia with a high rate of vacancy and violent crime. Despite endemic poverty in the surrounding neighborhood, the 2400 block of Sharswood Street became renowned in the 1980s for its cleanliness and tight-knit community. An inordinate number of children who grew up on the block went on to find success later in life in a variety of fields. Between 1977 and 1983, Vaux Junior High's chess team, the Bad Bishops, won an unprecedented seven consecutive national junior high school chess championships. In 1979, the team was invited to the White House and attended an international competition in Yugoslavia. Incomes in the neighborhood stagnated during the 20th century. In 1999, Sharswood had a median income of $18,773 ($34,599.45 in 2023 dollars).

The 2013 closure of Roberts Vaux Junior High School and Gen. John F. Reynolds Elementary School further disrupted the neighborhood's social cohesion and exacerbated the socioeconomic problems faced by residents. The closure of Vaux Junior High School was initially meant to be temporary, but plans to reopen it as a public school were scrapped.

== Sharswood-Blumberg Neighborhood Transformation Plan ==
In recent years, the neighborhood has seen significant change under the Philadelphia Housing Authority (PHA) Sharswood-Blumberg Neighborhood Transformation Plan. In November 2013, the PHA received a $500,000 grant through the Department of Housing and Urban Development's Choice Neighborhood Initiative to transform the site of the Norman Blumberg Apartments as well as the surrounding Sharswood neighborhood.

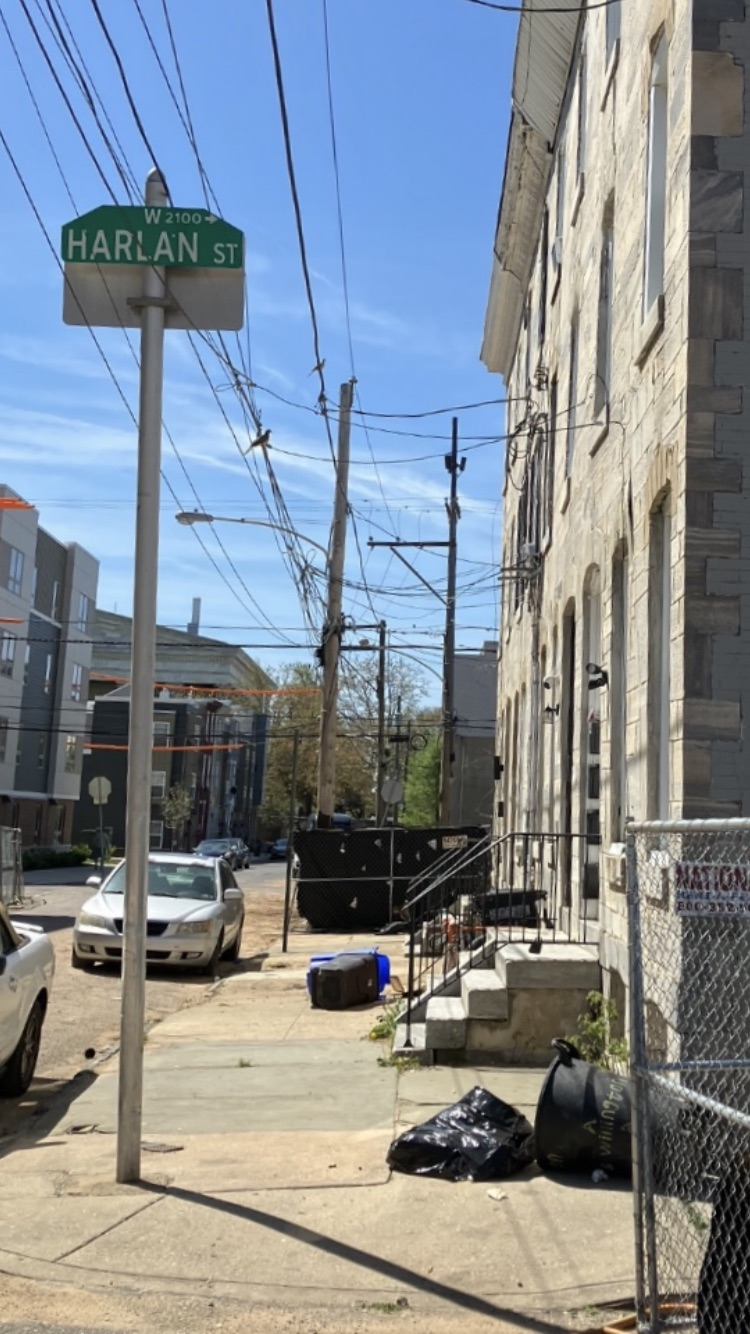
21st and Harlan Streets in 2024

Condemnation notices for more than 1,300 structures in the greater Sharswood neighborhood were sent out in 2015, and demolitions began shortly after. The PHA refused to complete a federally mandated Section 106 review of historic structures in the project area before issuing demolition orders. Fewer than 150 of the structures condemned in 2015 were occupied. Some occupied properties were wrongly classified by the PHA as vacant. Residents impacted by demolitions complained of rodent infestations as pests fled demolished buildings, as well as dust and vibrations from demolition and construction on adjacent parcels. Some residents also said that they were not given fair compensation for their properties seized through eminent domain, because the PHA did not take into account the cost of interior renovations when appraising the value of residents' homes. The owners of most of the homes seized by the PHA through eminent domain in 2015 did not receive compensation for several years. Many of the properties were appraised by the PHA at values thousands of dollars lower than the city's tax assessment valuation. Owners who contested these valuations had to undergo a lengthy review process.

Reynolds Elementary School was sold, along with four other schools, to the PHA for a total of $3 million in 2014. It has yet to re-open.

Between 2014 and 2016, a group of local gardeners led by Sharswood resident Tommy Joshua had a dispute with the PHA over land near the Blumberg Apartments which they had cleared of debris and turned into a garden called the North Philly Peace Park. The PHA had claimed ownership of the land via eminent domain and intended to build new apartments on it. In 2015, the housing authority fenced off the garden despite protests from residents. In 2016 the gardeners agreed to relocate to a parcel on 22nd and Jefferson Street.

Development in Sharswood began in earnest after the partial demolition of the Blumberg Apartments on March 19, 2016. 500 families were relocated from the Blumberg Apartments prior to demolition, in addition to a number of residents living in the surrounding rowhomes.

In 2016, Philadelphia's School Reform Commission sold the Vaux Junior High School building to the PHA for $2 million. In 2017, Big Picture Learning partnered with the PHA and the School District of Philadelphia to re-open Vaux Junior High School as a charter school offering a non-traditional model of education with a focus on internships and career preparedness for grades 9-12. Though the school is run by an outside education company, its employees are District employees represented by the American Federation of Teachers.

In 2019, the PHA opened a new $45 million headquarters at 2013 Ridge Avenue. Shortly after the new headquarters opened, dissatisfied PHA tenants, neighborhood residents, and others adversely affected by the housing crisis launched #OccupyPHA, a sustained protest outside the Ridge Avenue headquarters. Protestors remained encamped outside the headquarters for five months before disbanding.

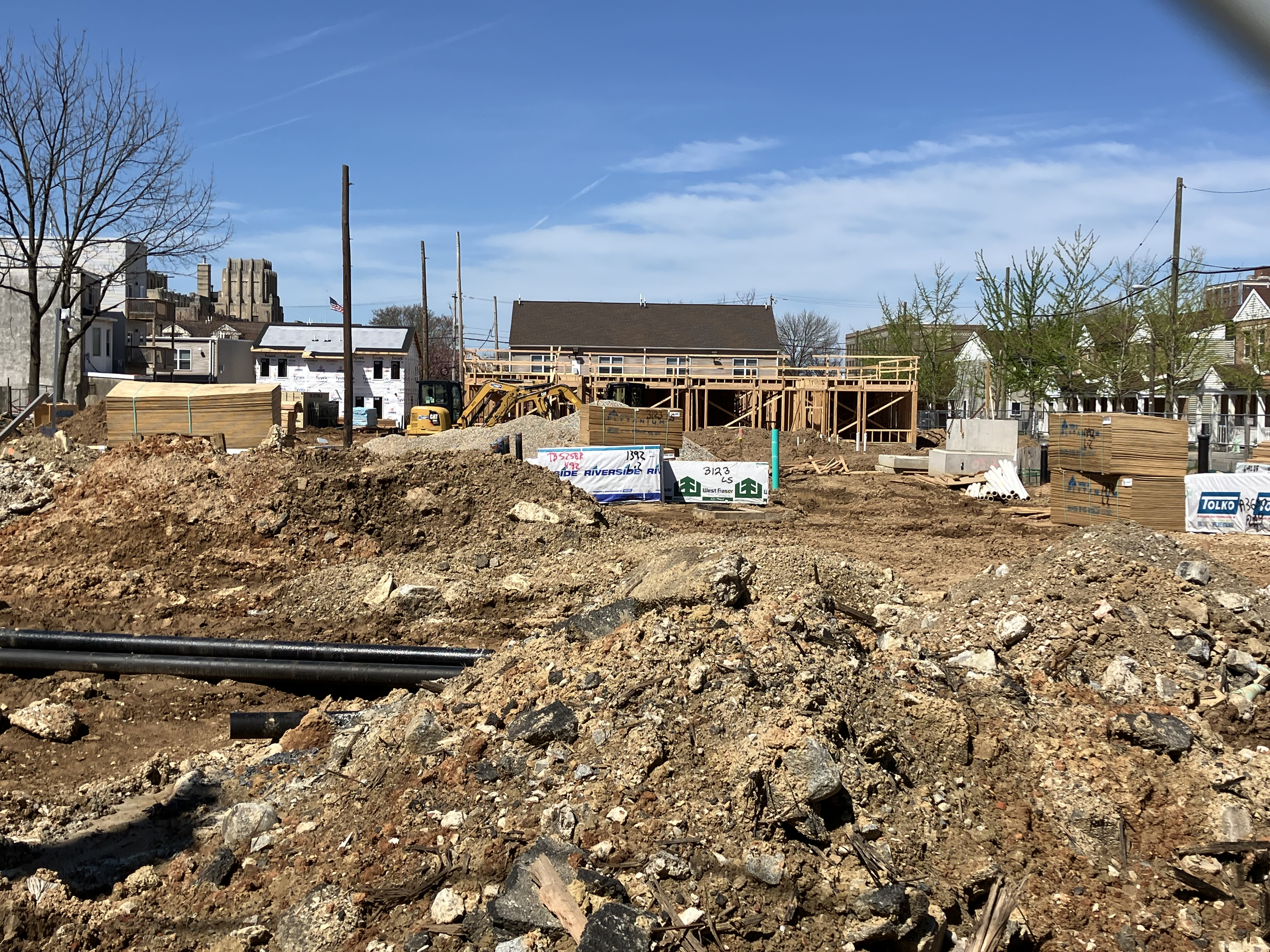
Construction in Sharswood

In 2020, the PHA received another $30 million in federal grants for the redevelopment of the Blumberg site. From June to October, protestors again camped outside of the PHA headquarters, eventually leaving when the PHA agreed to relocate them to nine vacant homes in Strawberry Mansion. The agreement with the protest encampment allowed the PHA to move forward with plans to construct a retail corridor north of its headquarters. An initial proposal for a suburban-style development with a large parking lot surrounding a standalone Save-A-Lot stalled due to disagreements between the developer and its retail tenant over the nature of the development.

In 2022, after the project was redesigned to promote a more walkable, dense environment, a shopping complex which included a Grocery Outlet, a bank and an urgent care facility opened on the parcel at Ridge and 21st. PHA President Kelvin A. Jeremiah said that this was the first grocery store to open in the vicinity of the Sharswood neighborhood since the 1964 Columbia Avenue Riot.

In March 2023, a deputy landlord-tenant officer (a private contractor who was not a sworn law enforcement official) shot Angel Davis, a tenant at the Girard Court Apartments, in the head while serving Davis and her husband with an eviction. Outcry over a string of shootings in 2023 by landlord-tenant officers, including this one, led to a temporary suspension of the landlord-tenant office's contract to serve evictions. During the suspension, evictions were served by the Sheriff's Office.
