= Bronx fire =

Bronx fire may refer to several fires in the Bronx, New York City:

- 1926 Knickerbocker Ice Company fire, a fire sparked during the demolition of an abandoned firehouse
- 1970s South Bronx building fires, a series of ongoing fires linked to public policy
- 1976 Puerto Rican Social Club fire, an act of arson by a family-member of a club participant
- 1990 Happy Land fire, an act of arson that was exacerbated by the building not being up-to-code
- 2017 Bronx apartment fire, which left 13 dead after a child was left unattended with an oven burner
- 2022 Bronx apartment fire, which left 17 dead after a defective space heater ignited
