= Education in Philadelphia =

Education in Philadelphia, Pennsylvania began with Benjamin Franklin's founding of the University of Pennsylvania as a European styled school and America's first university. Today's Philadelphia region is home to nearly 300,000 college students, numerous private and parochial secondary schools, and the 8th largest school district in the country.

== Public schools system: School District of Philadelphia ==
Philadelphia is served by the School District of Philadelphia, which operates 242 of the city's public schools, including 163 elementary schools, 23 middle schools, and 56 high schools.

The school district is governed by the nine-member Board of education, appointed by the Mayor of Philadelphia. This Board of Education replaced the previous School Reform Commission in 2018.

There are 84 independently operated charter schools, which make up the remainder of the public schools in Philadelphia. Charter schools are authorized by the School District of Philadelphia, and are accountable to it.

== Parochial schools ==
Philadelphia is home to the most extensive Catholic education system in the United States. Along with hundreds of parish-based elementary schools, there are also twelve Catholic high schools within the city ranging from Archdiocesan high schools to private Catholic high schools. All of the Catholic schools are affiliated with the Roman Catholic Archdiocese of Philadelphia.

== Private schools ==
- Frankford Friends School, a Quaker school grades PK-8, under the care of Frankford Monthly Meeting
- French International School of Philadelphia, the French international school serving the Philadelphia area, is in nearby Bala Cynwyd, Pennsylvania.
- Friends Select School, a Quaker school grades PK-12, under the care of Central Philadelphia Monthly Meeting and the Monthly Meeting of Friends of Philadelphia
- Germantown Friends School, a Quaker school grades PK-12, school under the care of Germantown Monthly Meeting
- Girard College, a primary and secondary educational institution, was endowed by French-American merchant, mariner and banker, Stephen Girard, opening its doors to disadvantaged youth in 1848.
- Greene Street Friends School, a Quaker school grades PK-8, school under the care of Green Street Monthly Meeting
- Holmesburg Christian Academy, a non-denominational evangelical Christian school in NE Philadelphia for grades PK-8, was founded in 1975 as a ministry of Holmesburg Baptist Church.
- Philadelphia Free School, a Sudbury school PK-12
- Philadelphia Mennonite High School, a Mennonite high school in the Fairmount neighborhood
- Springside Chestnut Hill Academy, (formerly Springside School and Chestnut Hill Academy, respectively) a school grades PK-12 located in the Chestnut Hill section of the city
- St. Peter's School, an independent, coeducational, nonsectarian PK-8 school in the Society Hill neighborhood
- William Penn Charter School was founded by Penn in 1689, is the oldest Quaker school in the nation, under the care of the Board of Overseers.

=== Friends Schools League ===
The Friends' Schools League (FSL) is an athletic league made up of student athletes from several private high schools in the Philadelphia area in Pennsylvania. As the league's name suggests, it consists primarily of Quaker schools, though in recent years several other schools have become part of the league as well.

==== Member schools ====
Member schools include:

- Abington Friends School
- Academy of the New Church Secondary Schools
- Friends Central School
- Friends Select School
- George School
- Germantown Friends School
- The Shipley School
- Westtown School
- Jack M. Barrack Hebrew Academy

== Miscellaneous weekend education ==
The Japanese Language School of Philadelphia (JLSP, フィラデルフィア日本語補習授業校 Firaderufia Nihongo Hoshū Jugyō Kō), a supplementary Japanese school, holds its classes, intended for Japanese nationals and Japanese Americans, at the Friends Central School (FCS) in nearby Wynnewood.

== Higher education ==
Philadelphia is one of the largest college towns in the U.S., with over 120,000 college and university students enrolled within the city limits and nearly 300,000 in the metropolitan area.

Colleges and Universities within the city:

- The Art Institute of Philadelphia
- Chestnut Hill College
- Community College of Philadelphia
- Curtis Institute of Music
- Drexel University
- Holy Family University
- La Salle University
- Moore College of Art and Design
- Peirce College
- Pennsylvania Academy of the Fine Arts
- Philadelphia College of Osteopathic Medicine
- Philadelphia University
- The Restaurant School
- Saint Joseph's University
- Temple University
- Thomas Jefferson University
- University of the Arts
- University of the Sciences in Philadelphia
- University of Pennsylvania

Colleges and universities near Philadelphia include:

- Arcadia University (formerly Beaver College), in Glenside, Pennsylvania
- Bryn Athyn College of the New Church, in Bryn Athyn, Pennsylvania
- Bryn Mawr College, in Bryn Mawr, Pennsylvania
- Bucks County Community College, with campuses in Newtown, Bucks County, Pennsylvania and Perkasie, Pennsylvania
- Cabrini College, in Radnor
- Cairn University (formerly Philadelphia Biblical University), in Langhorne, Pennsylvania
- Cheyney University of Pennsylvania, in Cheyney, Pennsylvania
- College of New Jersey, Ewing Township, New Jersey
- Cooper Medical School of Rowan University, Camden, New Jersey
- Delaware County Community College, located in Marple Township, Pennsylvania
- Delaware Valley College, in Doylestown, Pennsylvania
- Eastern University (formerly Eastern College), in St. David's, Pennsylvania
- Gratz College, in Melrose Park, Pennsylvania
- Gwynedd Mercy University, Gwynedd Valley, Pennsylvania
- Harcum College, in Bryn Mawr, Pennsylvania
- Haverford College, in Haverford, Pennsylvania
- Immaculata University, in Malvern, Pennsylvania
- Lafayette College, in Easton, Pennsylvania
- Lehigh University, in Bethlehem, Pennsylvania
- Lincoln University, located in Chester County, Pennsylvania
- Manor College, in Jenkintown, Pennsylvania
- Montgomery County Community College, in Blue Bell, Pennsylvania
- Neumann University, in Aston, Pennsylvania
- Princeton University, in Princeton, New Jersey
- Pennsylvania Institute of Technology, in Media, Pennsylvania and Philadelphia, Pennsylvania
- Pennsylvania State University - (Abington Campus) in Abington, the (Brandywine Campus) in Media, and the (Great Valley Graduate School) in Malvern, Pennsylvania
- Reconstructionist Rabbinical College, in Wyncote, Pennsylvania
- Rider University, Lawrenceville, New Jersey
- Rosemont College, in Bryn Mawr, Pennsylvania
- Rowan University, in Glassboro and Camden, New Jersey
- Rowan-Virtua School of Osteopathic Medicine, in Stratford, New Jersey
- Rutgers University - (Camden Campus), in Camden, New Jersey
- St. Charles Borromeo Seminary, in Wynnewood, Pennsylvania
- Salus University, in Elkins Park, Pennsylvania
- Swarthmore College, in Swarthmore, Pennsylvania
- Temple University - Ambler Campus, in Ambler, Pennsylvania
- University of Delaware, in Newark, Delaware
- Ursinus College, in Collegeville, Pennsylvania
- Valley Forge Military Academy and College, in Wayne, Pennsylvania
- Villanova University, in Villanova, Pennsylvania
- West Chester University, in West Chester, Pennsylvania
- Westminster Theological Seminary in Glenside, Pennsylvania
- Widener University, in Chester, Pennsylvania
- Widener University School of Law, in Wilmington, Delaware
- Wilmington University, in Wilmington, Delaware
