= Public housing in Philadelphia =

Public housing in Philadelphia is a significant portion of the overall housing stock in Philadelphia. Most public housing is operated by the Philadelphia Housing Authority. On average, a Philadelphia public housing development is 69% African American, 26% Hispanic, and 5% White and other.

== List of public housing projects ==
- Abbottsford Homes North Philadelphia
- Arch Homes West Philadelphia
- Bartram Village Homes Southwest Philadelphia
- Cambridge Homes North Philadelphia (demolished)
- Carl Mackley Houses, Juniata (now privately owned apartments)
- Cecil B. Moore Homes North Philadelphia
- Champlost Homes Germantown
- 8 Diamonds (AME) North Philadelphia
- Fairhill Homes North Philadelphia
- Falls Ridge Homes East Falls
- Haddington Homes West Philadelphia
- Harrison Homes North Philadelphia
- Haverford Homes West Philadelphia
- Hill Creek Apartments located in Northeast Philadelphia
- James W. Johnson Homes North Philadelphia, in the Strawberry Mansion neighborhood
- Liddonfield Homes Northeast Philadelphia (fully demolished)
- Lucien E. Blackwell Homes West Philadelphia
- Mantua Hall Homes West Philadelphia (demolished)
- Martin Luther King Homes South Philadelphia (demolished)
- Mill Creek Plaza West Philadelphia (demolished)
- Morton Homes Germantown, Philadelphia
- Norman Blumberg Apartments North Philadelphia (partially demolished)
- Norris Homes North Philadelphia (apartment tower demolished)
- Oxford Village Homes Northeast Philadelphia
- Paschall Homes Southwest Philadelphia (demolished)
- Passyunk Homes South Philadelphia (demolished)
- Queen Lane Apartments Germantown (demolished)
- Raymond Rosen Homes North Philadelphia (demolished)
- Richard Allen Homes North Philadelphia (demolished)
- Richard Allen II North Philadelphia
- Riverview Courts South Philadelphia
- Schuylkill Falls Homes East Falls (demolished)
- Sen. Herbert Arlene Homes North Philadelphia
- Southwark Plaza South Philadelphia (partially demolished)
- Spring Garden Homes North Philadelphia
- Tasker Homes South Philadelphia, in the Grays Ferry neighborhood (demolished, replaced by Greater Grays Ferry Estates)
- Westpark Homes West Philadelphia
- White Hall Commons (Red Brick) Northeast Philadelphia (Frankford)
- Wilson Park Homes South Philadelphia

== See also ==
- Public housing
- Public housing in the United States
