= 2022 Philadelphia apartment fire =

Fatal blaze in Pennsylvania

- Date: January 5, 2022
- Time: c. 6:40 a.m. EST (UTC−05)
- Location: Fairmount, Philadelphia, Pennsylvania, US; 39°58′17.3″N 75°10′27.7″W
- Type: Fire
- Deaths: 12
- Injuries: 2

On the morning of January 5, 2022, a fire tore through a row house converted into apartments in the Fairmount neighborhood of Philadelphia, Pennsylvania. Twelve people died, nine of them children, and two others were injured. Five additional people escaped from the first floor unit with minor injuries. The fire happened just four days before the 2022 Bronx apartment fire, also in the Northeastern United States.

== Building ==
The building was a three-story rowhouse that had been split into two apartments and operated by the Philadelphia Housing Authority. It had one fire extinguisher in a shared entryway on the first floor; however as neither the city's building codes nor PHA policy require additional measures for rental units that size, there were initially no other safety measures. The building had no additional fire extinguishers, sprinklers, fire escapes, or tamper proof smoke detectors provided in the rentals. PHA had installed four smoke detectors in each rental unit of the duplex in 2019 and an additional two in 2020. The units were inspected by the PHA separately in April and May 2021 and both were found to have working smoke detectors at that time.

There were at least twenty-six people living in the duplex with eighteen living in the front section of the second floor and the entire third floor. Eight others lived in the first floor and rear half of the second floor.

== Fire ==
The fire began around 6:30 a.m. EST on the second floor of the duplex, and neighbors claimed to hear screams around 6:30 a.m. Firefighters responded by about 6:40 a.m., finding a heavy fire coming from the kitchen area and heading up the staircase to the third floor. Firefighters and investigators believe that the fire began at a Christmas tree in the southwest corner of the second floor unit, near the open stairwell to the third story. Fire Commissioner Adam Thiel said that of the six smoke alarms that were in the unit when the fire started, none were operational when the fire happened. Five had had their batteries removed, and one had been destroyed. There was one working alarm in the basement.

Of the fourteen people occupying the unit at the time only two were rescued. A 5-year-old child was found on the second floor and an adult was able to escape out a window, with both classified as critically injured and hospitalized. The child later told investigators at the hospital, that he had been playing with an orange cigarette lighter and accidentally set the tree on fire. A lighter was found near the tree after the fire had been extinguished and no other potential ignition sources was found during the preliminary investigation.

== Victims ==
Of the occupants of the second and third floor rental, 12 people were killed; three adults and nine children. All of the deceased were members of the same family and all lived in the same unit. A relative told reporters that in the fire she had lost her three daughters aged between 18 and 33 years old and nine grandchildren aged four to 16 years old. City officials did not announce any of the victims' ages or names initially, but later confirmed the adults and children's ages and identities.

The Philadelphia Department of Public Health's Medical Examiner's Office named the victims.

== Investigation ==
The Bureau of Alcohol, Tobacco, Firearms and Explosives announced on January 6 that they were mobilizing their National Response Team to help with the investigation due to the magnitude of the fire to help the city's fire marshal and police department.

The Philadelphia Inquirer reported that a five-year-old boy who escaped the fire stated to investigators that the blaze started after he accidentally lit a Christmas tree on fire while playing with a lighter. The Philadelphia Fire Commissioner Adam Thiel told reporters on January 11, that the commission believed "with certainty, so 99 to 100% confidence" that the fire was caused by a Christmas tree in the second floor unit, but could not definitively say who started the fire.

In 2024, on the second anniversary of the fire, the victims' families filed a federal civil rights lawsuit against the PHA and the Philadelphia Department of Human Services, alleging that the departments knew the building lacked effective fire safety features.

== Reactions ==
PHA President and CEO Kelvin Jeremiah spoke out in support of the family who lived in the second and third floor unit and called for others to suspend their judgement of the family and other PHA tenants. Jeremiah highlighted that it was not PHA policy to evict families that grew in size and the lease had been updated to show the increase in family members over the years. He also took the time to highlight the need for funding to increase additional fire safety improvements in the older PHA homes and the improvements seen in newer buildings.

News reports on the fire brought up the subject of overcrowded housing. The New York Times wrote, "Firefighters found that 18 people had been inside the four-bedroom public housing unit, triple the number of people who had moved in a decade earlier... the family had wanted to move to a larger home for years... But with 40,000 households already on the waiting list for public housing in Philadelphia, they had little choice." Fire officials said the building was overcrowded, with 26 people inside a structure that was meant to accommodate two families. Philadelphia law did not limit the number of people who can occupy a home, after a judge determined such limitations violated residents’ rights.

== See also ==
- 2022 Bronx apartment fire
- Fire safety
- Public housing in Philadelphia
- African-American family structure
