= Norman Blumberg Apartments =

Philadelphia public housing project demolished in 2016

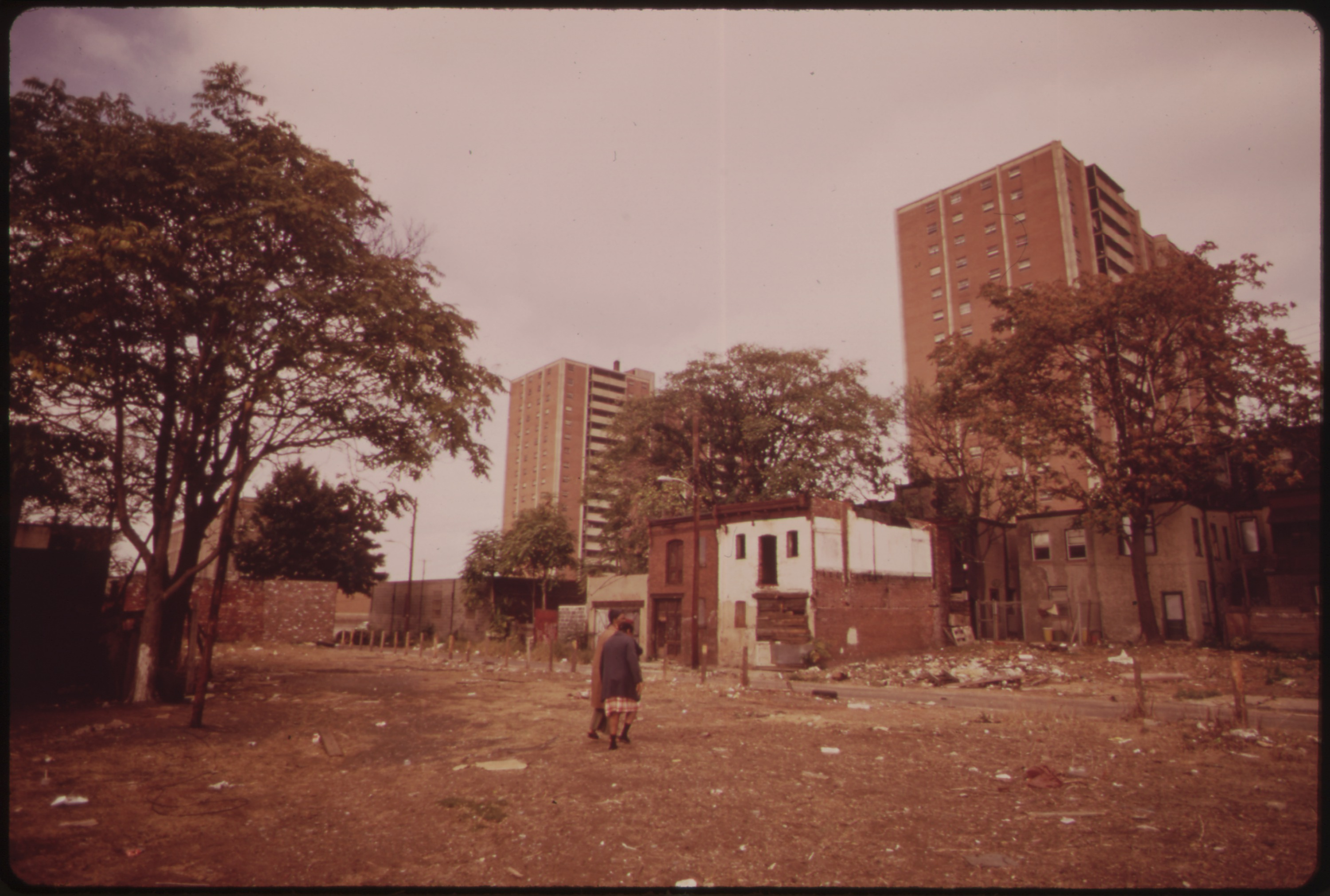
The Blumberg Apartments in 1973, photographed from the 2300 block of W Oxford St.

The Norman Blumberg Apartments, also known as the Blumberg Homes, were a 510-unit high rise public housing complex in the Sharswood neighborhood of Philadelphia, Pennsylvania. Owned and operated by the Philadelphia Housing Authority, they were viewed by many as a symbol of the City's failure to address concentrated poverty and crime and were partially demolished in 2016.

== Background and Construction ==
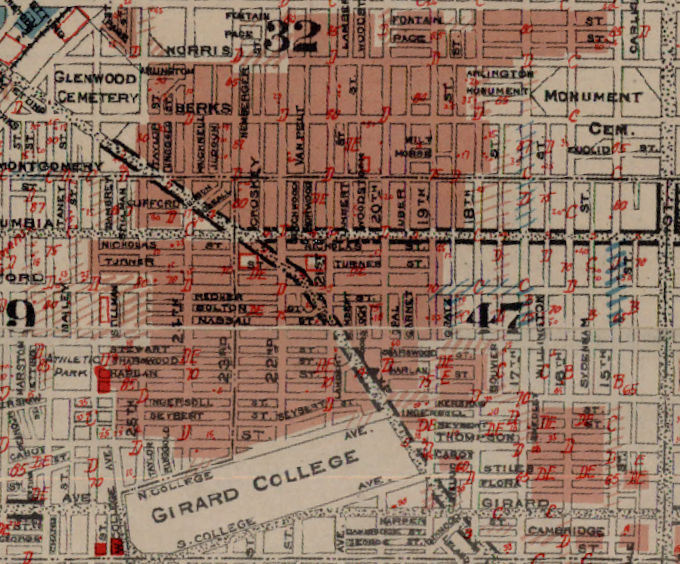
J.M. Brewer's 1934 map showing redlining in Sharswood

Photos from the Philadelphia Department of Records show that the area around 23rd and Jefferson consisted mainly of typical prewar blocks of rowhouses. The PHA was formally established in 1937. During the postwar public housing boom, the PHA constructed a number of high rise apartments in areas of the city where little community resistance was expected, such as blocks near industrial areas and highways or communities already experiencing white flight and disinvestment. During the Great Migration, Sharswood was a neighborhood that experienced an influx of African-American migration from the south. J.M. Brewer's 1934 map of Philadelphia as well as maps produced by the federal government's Home Owners' Loan Corporation in 1937 show that the Sharswood neighborhood was redlined, and corresponding documents report that buildings in the area were in a state of poor repair, despite being between 20 and 65 years old. The population was 80% black and consisted mainly of laborers and mechanics with an average annual income of $900–1,800 and a high number of families on public assistance. Longtime residents of Sharswood say that in the prewar era, the neighborhood was segregated and black residents could not go to nearby white neighborhoods like Girard Avenue and Swampoodle. However, the neighborhood was initially more economically integrated, with black doctors, lawyers and other middle class professionals living alongside working class residents. As the United States moved towards racial integration and the children of middle class residents achieved educational attainment, they moved to other neighborhoods or out of the city.

Named after Norman Blumberg, an influential president of the Philadelphia AFL-CIO, the Blumberg Apartments were designed by the engineering firm Bellante & Clauss and consisted of 108 rowhouses, two 18-story towers with one, two and three bedroom apartments, and a 13-story building for seniors. The initial construction of the housing complex cost $5.5 million. During construction, the blocks between 24th and 22nd streets were consolidated, with Redner, Bolton and Nassau streets being closed to form an 8-acre block. In 1966 the PHA was picketed by the Building Trades Council in an ongoing dispute over prevailing wage rates. The projects were ultimately completed at or around their deadline in March 1967.

== History ==
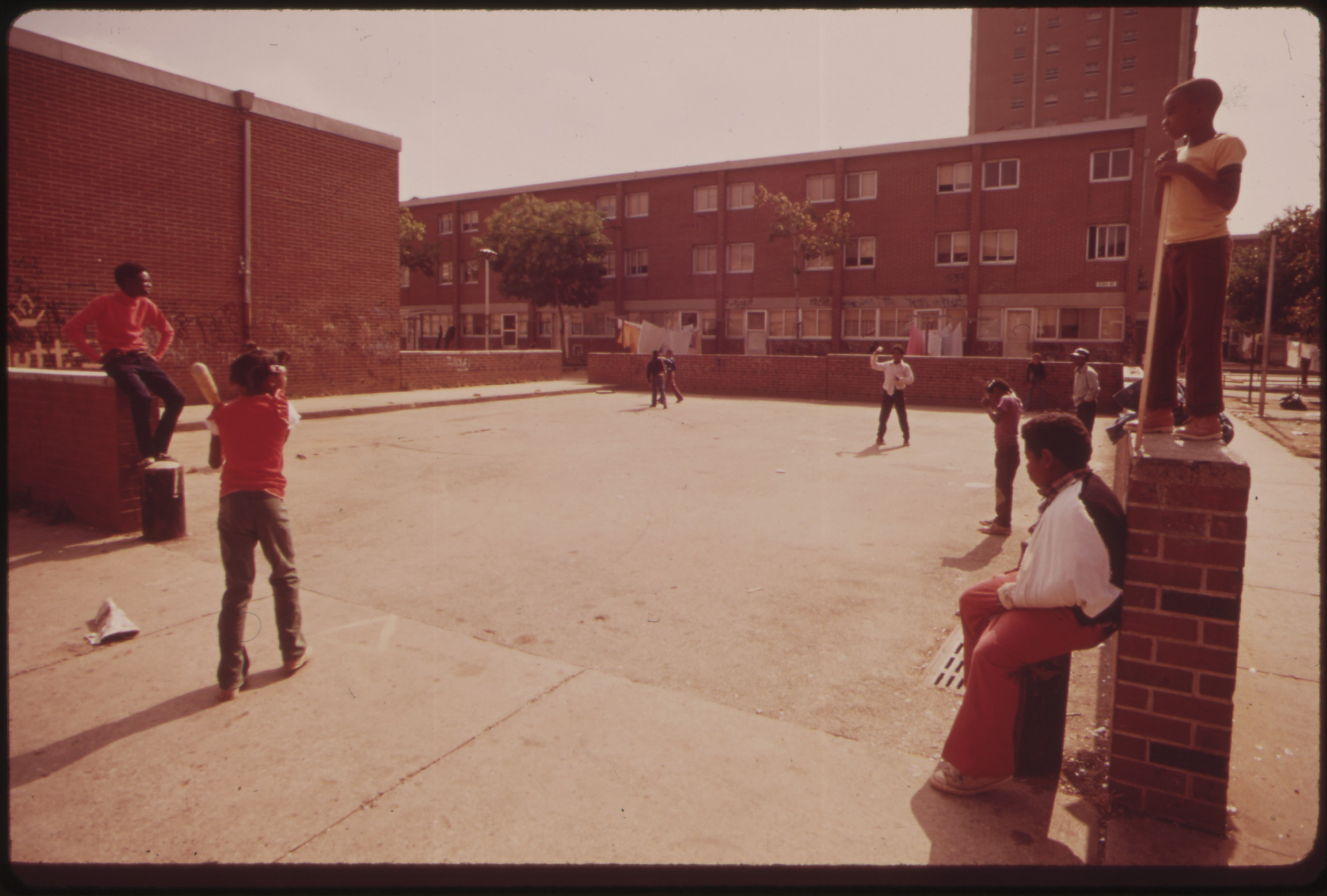
The play area of the Blumberg Apartments in 1973

The Blumberg Homes opened in June, 1967. Though the apartment towers had some early critics, they were initially well regarded by residents and included a 900 square foot garden and community programming. As the buildings aged and conditions in the surrounding neighborhood declined further, problems emerged. During a snowstorm that brought record cold temperatures in February 1979, 40 residents of the Blumberg Apartments blocked traffic at Ridge and Columbia Avenue in protest of the lack of heat, burst pipes and general state of disrepair in the project. In 1982, a 4 year old boy died and his 3 year old brother was injured when they fell from the 13th floor window of one of the towers. In addition to increasing maintenance costs, the PHA was plagued by corruption, negligence and waste. An internal audit found that the Housing Authority had "no system of internal controls to adequately protect or even measure its multimillion dollar inventory of parts and supplies." In 1989, after a tenant died while trying to repair a chronically broken elevator, the Blumberg Homes' elevator contractor was accused of defrauding the Housing Authority by intentionally vandalizing and repairing the elevators at PHA properties. Later that year, four homicides took place at the apartments within the same week. During a political battle over the agency's future, PHA Executive Director Gregory Kern called conditions at the Blumberg Homes "unmanageable" due to crime and physical deterioration. At this time, the agency was still seeking federal funding to rehabilitate the property, while critics of the PHA such as Pennsylvania Senator Chakah Fattah made renewed calls for PHA tenants to be relocated to rehabilitated vacant properties elsewhere in the city. After Kern's resignation the new PHA director, John Paone, was the first to seek federal grants to demolish the Blumberg Homes and other PHA high rises. However, the agency ultimately decided to maintain the Blumberg Apartments into the 21st century.

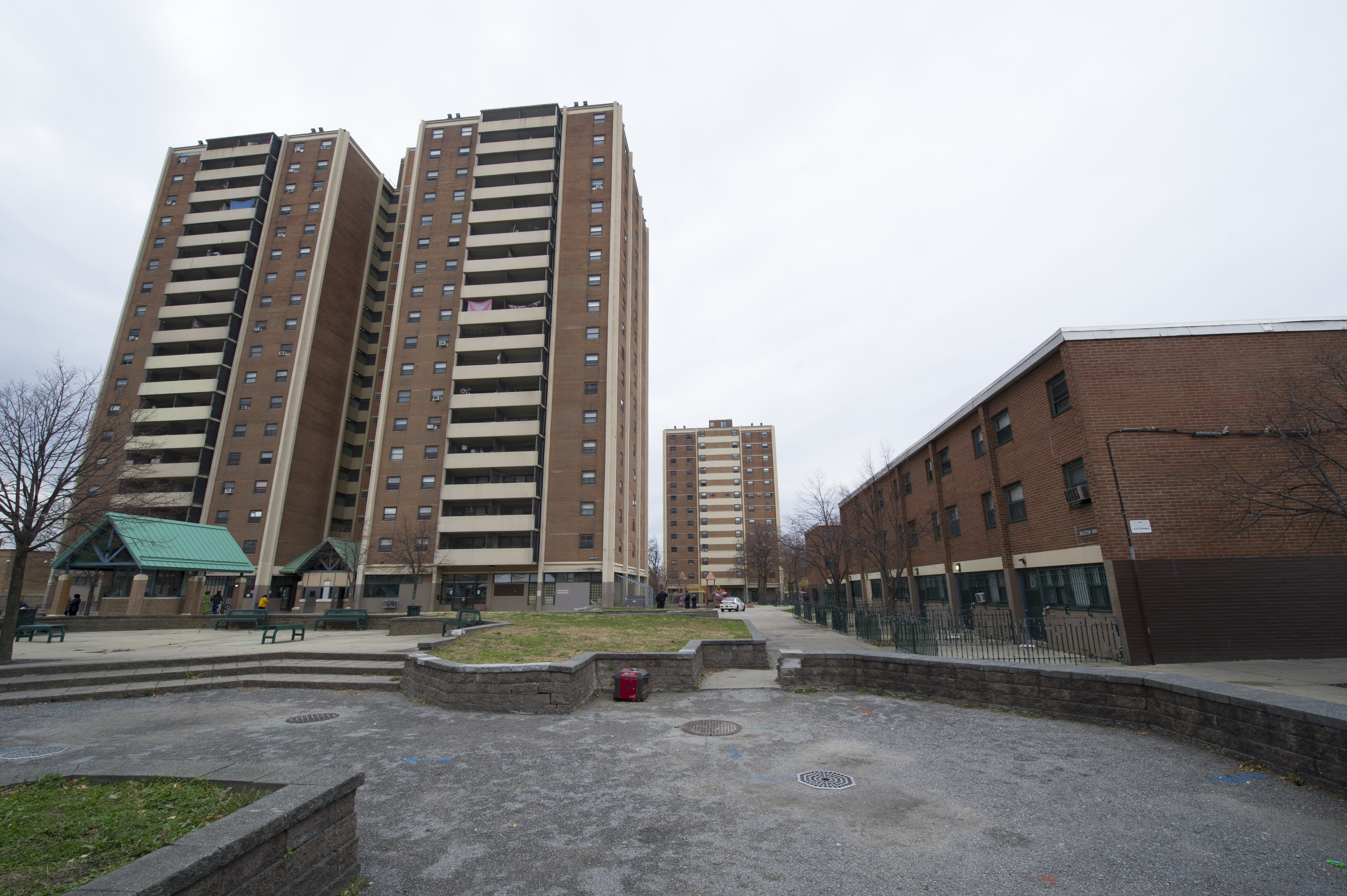
The Blumberg Apartments in 2013

In September 1994, an intake center for drug and alcohol addicts opened its doors inside the Blumberg complex. In 1997, one of the apartment towers was renovated at a cost of $15 million under the leadership of John F. White Jr. Upgrades to the apartment included security infrastructure such as fencing, an iron gate, a bulletproof security booth and electronic key-cards that officials hoped would curtail drug and criminal activity on the property. The PHA also deployed funding it received through several HUD grants in the late 1990s to expand community policing throughout its properties, including at the Blumberg Homes. In spite of renewed investment in the Blumberg Homes, the surrounding area continued to decline. At the time that the renovations under White were completed the Sharswood neighborhood had lost nearly a fourth of its population since 1980, had the 5th highest murder rate in the city and had a 30% vacancy rate. In 2011 a fire broke out in one of the high-rises, displacing 11 families and injuring 6 tenants as well as 10 firefighters. In the aftermath of the fire, tenants complained that fire alarms inside the buildings went off so frequently that they didn't know whether to take them seriously.

== Sharswood Transformation Plan and Demolition ==
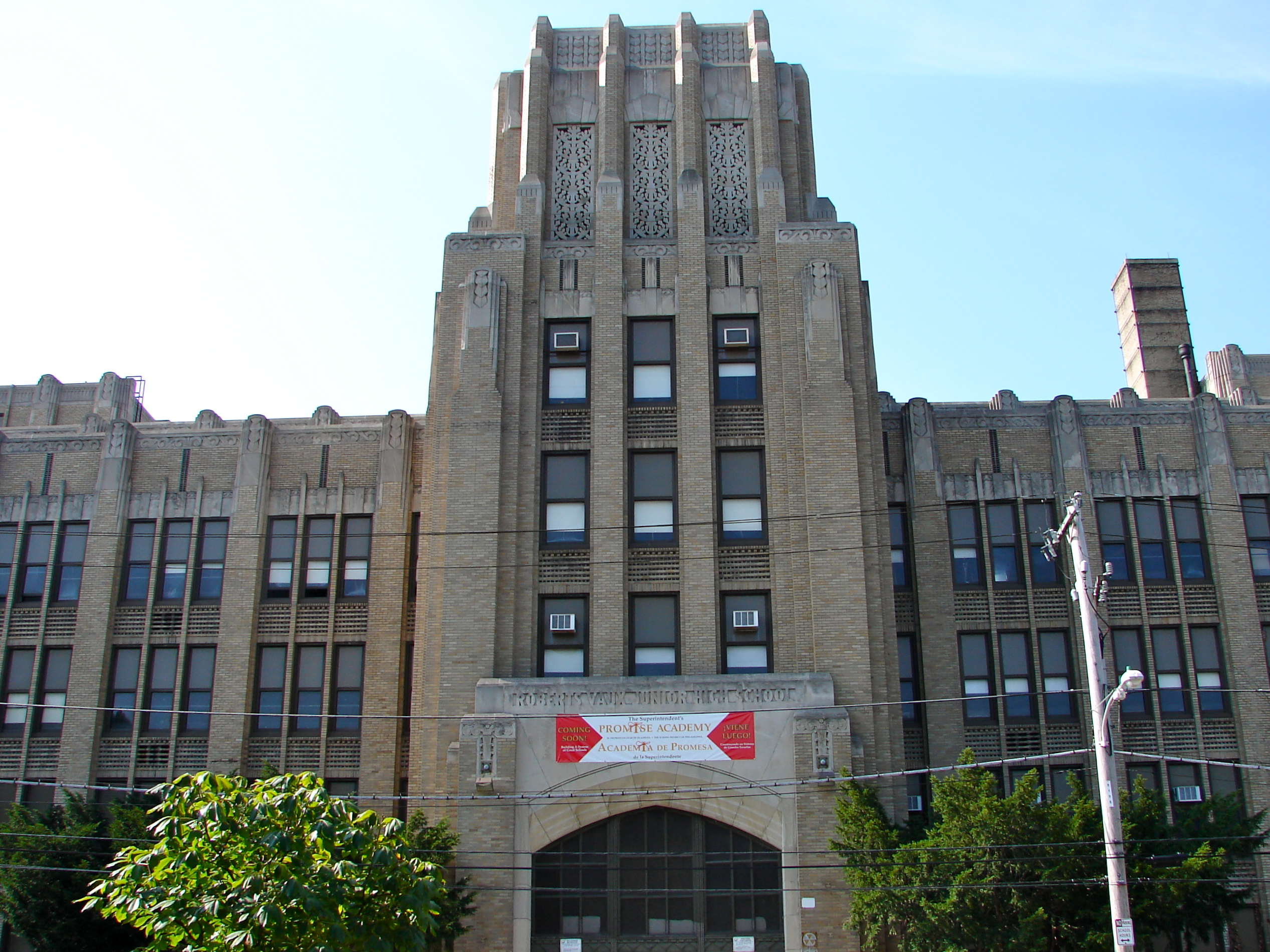
Vaux Jr. High School, 2300 Master Street, closed in 2013

The turn of the 21st century saw significant changes to the neighborhoods surrounding the Blumberg homes. First, the City purchased and demolished rows of low-rise housing to the south and east of the Blumberg Apartments during Mayor John F. Street's Neighborhood Transformation Initiative. The aim of this policy was to subsidize private development by consolidating parcels of land to make them viable for the construction of new market-rate housing. By 2013 many of the vacant parcels around the Blumberg Apartments had failed to attract private investment. What remained of the neighborhood's housing stock had continued to deteriorate, and the closure of Reynolds Elementary School and Roberts Vaux Jr. High School in 2013 left the educational needs of the Sharswood neighborhood under-served. With many of the surrounding Northwest Philadelphia neighborhoods having seen reinvestment and Sharswood lagging behind, the PHA applied for a $500,000 federal grant to create a master plan for the greater Sharswood-Blumberg area.

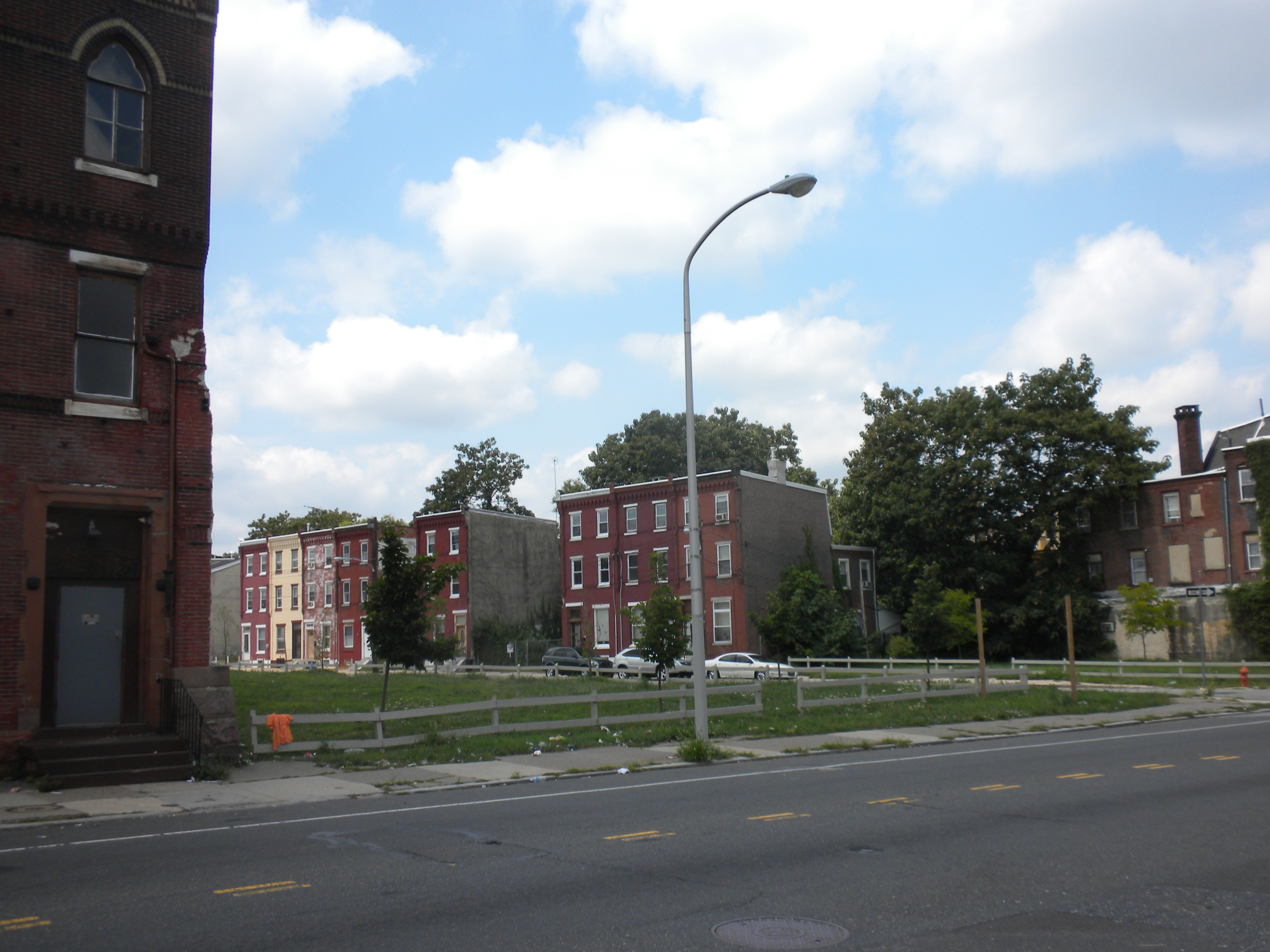
1810 Ridge Ave

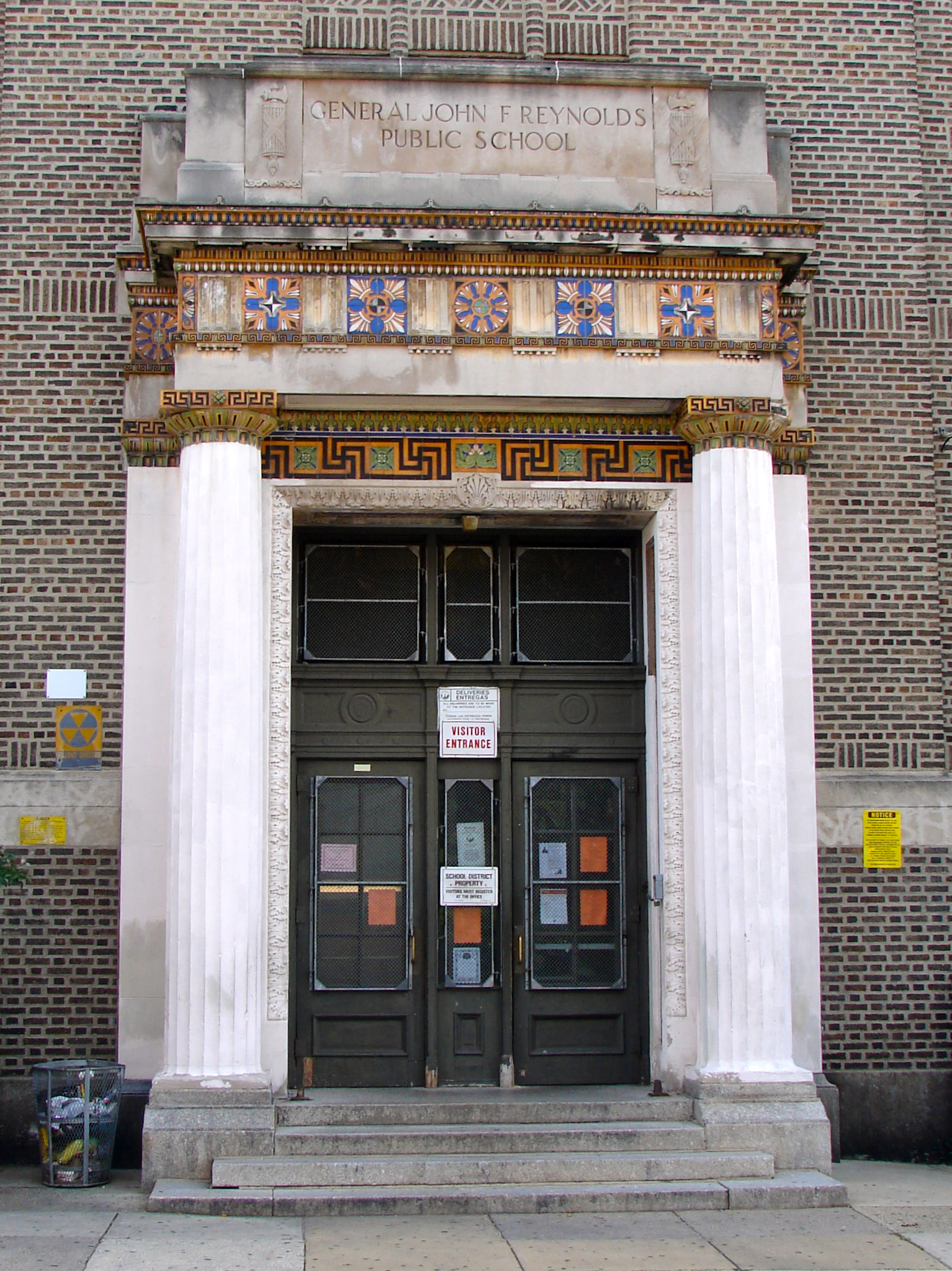
John F. Reynolds School

In 2015, The PHA released its Sharswood Blumberg Neighborhood Transformation Plan, which called for the construction of 57 new low rise units on the Blumberg site, renovation of the Blumberg Senior Tower, the seizure of 1,300 nearby properties through eminent domain and the demolition of the Blumberg Homes' family housing units. While the plan called for the renovated Senior Tower and the 57 PHA units to remain affordable at 30% of the Area Median Income, the remainder of the 1,203 replacement units were to be rented at 50 to greater than 120 percent of the Area Median Income. The PHA also shared plans for a commercial corridor on Ridge Avenue between 20th and 23rd Streets and the construction of a new PHA headquarters on Oxford and Jefferson Streets. On March 19, 2016 the Philadelphia Housing Authority demolished the Blumberg Apartments' two 18-story family housing towers. The 108 low rise homes were demolished shortly after. In December 2019 the PHA opened 83 prefabricated low rise apartments built using modular wood frame construction techniques. The Blumberg 83 development was financed through HUD's Rental Assistance Demonstration program and with Low Income Housing Tax Credits, and serves people making between 20 and 60 percent of the area median income.
