= Twin Parks =

Housing development in the Bronx, New York

- Interactive map of the Twin Parks area

General information
- Classification: Scatter-site housing
- Location: East Tremont, Tremont and Fordham, The Bronx, New York City
- Coordinates: 40.846°N 73.887°W
- Groundbreaking: September 30, 1970 (55 years ago)
- Completed: 1971–1981; largely completed in 1973
- Owner: Private owners, New York City Housing Authority

Design and construction
- Architects: The Architects Collaborative, Giovanni Pasanella, Richard Meier, and Skidmore, Owings & Merrill.
- Awards: Awards from the City Club of New York, the New York Society or Architects and Municipal Art Society

Twin Parks is a housing development in the Bronx, New York City. Its buildings were designed by leading architects, and were widely hailed as "the cutting edge of public design" when constructed in the early 1970s.

The project, divided into Twin Parks West and Twin Parks East, consists of 2,250 apartments, three schools, and three day care centers; it is located in the central Bronx. The two segments of the Twin Parks development are located several blocks from each other in the East Tremont, Tremont and Fordham neighborhoods, with Twin Parks East situated adjacent to Bronx Park and Twin Parks West near Webster Avenue. The development is named after Bronx Park and Crotona Park, which also is nearby.

Despite its early promise, Twin Parks was deemed a failure because the project was beset by violence and failed to curb neighborhood decline. It was the site of a fire that killed 17 people and injured 44 others on January 9, 2022.

== Background ==
Twin Parks was originally designated as an urban renewal area in 1963. At the time, the neighborhood was undergoing transformation from largely Italian-American to Puerto Rican and black. The city government hoped that new housing would prevent "white flight" to the suburbs and foster integration. A group of recent architecture school graduates commenced a "Twin Parks Study" in 1966, which identified possible locations for middle and low-income housing. The plan was developed in collaboration with the Twin Parks Association, a neighborhood coalition.

The project was announced in 1967 by the Association, then consisting of 14 neighborhood and religious groups, in association with Herman Badillo, then Bronx borough president, and then-New York City Mayor John Lindsay’s Public Design Committee. The chairman was Rev. Mario Zicarelli, pastor of the Our Lady of Mount Carmel Roman Catholic church in Belmont. The housing developments were described as a "timely stopgap to prevent further deterioration of the neighborhoods." East Tremont and its surrounding neighborhoods suffered from numerous issues related to urban decay and population loss at the time of its construction.

The Twin Parks Association intended to be the developer, but could not raise money and had to relinquish control in order to implement the project. In 1969, Lindsay agreed that the newly created New York State Urban Development Corporation, headed by urban planner, Edward J. Logue, would finance and develop Twin Parks.

== Design and construction ==
Groundbreaking for the project was on September 30, 1970. It was largely completed in 1973, with parts of Twin Parks West built in 1974 and the final component, a senior housing unit on Crotona Avenue, completed in 1981. It was designed as "scatter-site" housing, "structures designed to work into the existing fabric of the neighborhood and avoid the wholesale bulldozing characteristic of much earlier urban renewal." New York Times architecture critic Paul Goldberger wrote in 1973:

Twin Parks gets to the crux of a question that hovers, often unmentioned, over much architecture today: just how much the architect can do, or whether buildings by serious designers make much of a difference in the lives of people in neighborhoods like this section of the Bronx.

Notable architectural firms and architects were commissioned to design each of the Twin Parks affordable apartment buildings, including The Architects Collaborative, Giovanni Pasanella, Richard Meier, and Skidmore, Owings & Merrill. Public spaces and building facades were designed with input from the local community. Prentice & Chan, Ohlhausen, in collaboration with landscape architect Terry Schnadelbach, designed Twin Parks North West, The design for that included a playground, covered patio, an herb garden, and a laundry room located on the ground floor.

Though Twin Parks and other UDC projects were planned and developed by that state agency, some of the united were privately owned while others, including Twin Parks West, were initially managed by the New York City Housing Authority.

Twin Parks was closely watched at the time, and was an "experiment in getting inner-city housing right," in contrast to housing projects in New York and other cities that had failed. Residents were surveyed for their preferences in apartments, facades, and public spaces, and the project was constructed with their desires in mind. The project opened to what The New York Times has described as "tremendous fanfare," as "a progressive experiment by New York State at the time that was meant to reimagine modern subsidized affordable housing in a square-mile area of New York City." At the time of the groundbreaking in 1970, models of the development were on display at the Whitney Museum as part of a show titled "Another Chance for Cities."

In 1971, the Twin Parks Association, by then comprising 47 neighborhood organizations, obtained the power to screen and approve tenants for the project, excluding persons with a history of narcotics addiction, and to seek a racial balance. Temporary guidelines called for the project to have 20 percent poor tenants, 10 percent elderly and the remainder moderate income.

Twin Parks was viewed as an alternative to large-scale public housing blocks, which had replaced aging row homes and tenement buildings throughout the city. It was that East Tremont was losing up to 1,000 housing units per year to abandonment and arson fires by the early 1970s. Instead of being clustered together, the buildings "were set apart on purpose across 12 locations, each designed by an architectural firm to create a sense of community for the residents." It was hoped that buildings of architectural quality would result in happy residents and safe neighborhoods.

=== Accolades ===
The Twin Parks Northeast buildings, designed by Richard Meier, won awards from the City Club of New York and the New York Society or Architects, and were praised by Goldberger as "cool, elegant structures, with probably the most‐refined facades ever designed for public housing."

The two North West buildings, one of which was the site of the 2022 fire, were considered the most innovative of the buildings in Twin Parks, and was praised by the Times architecture critic Goldberger as the best of the development. They were designed by the firm of Prentice and Chan, Ohlhausen, and the site of the fire was built as an angular structure in contrast to adjacent buildings, and opened up to a park area. The buildings straddle a high rock escarpment.

In 1971, the Municipal Art Society presented its "survival award" to the Twin Parks Association, saying that its "efforts demonstrate in a highly visible form that the city can and will survive despite the desperate problems that now beset it."

== Subsequent history ==
In 1973, Goldberger reported that the award-winning Twin Parks Northeast buildings, "are situated, by unfortunate chance, at the boundary between black and Italian sections of the neighborhood, and as a result the generous open space became the setting for gang disputes." Goldberger wrote that though the buildings were "good architecture" and that some "may turn out to be important buildings in the history of housing design." But he observed that while the neighborhood may have been improved by Twin Parks, "architecture alone, no matter how good, cannot in itself change a neighborhood."

Central plazas, which were designed to encourage interaction between residents, "became war zones for teenage gangs, forcing the UDC to install gates and other physical barriers to separate groups from one another and make other residents feel more secure." In 1985, when two boys were found slain in a stairwell at Twin Parks South West, residents complained about crime in the building and a security guard called it a "death trap." In 1986, accused murderer Larry Davis was apprehended after taking refuge in an apartment he had taken by force at Twin Parks West.

The project's original intent to foster integration was not realized. In 1973, Logue concluded that efforts to integrate Twin Parks were largely "hopeless." However, efforts to integrate different income groups were more successful. Tenants of the privately owned buildings also have expressed concern that their protection from rent increases under the Mitchell-Lama program will someday terminate, though state action in 2013 guaranteed affordable rents for another 40 years.

Twin Parks was sold in 2019 to a private partnership between LIHC Investment Group, Belveron Partners, and Camber Property Group, who purchased it along with other Bronx buildings for a total price of $166 million. Camber was responsible for day-to-day operations. Camber's co-founders include Rick Gropper, a housing adviser to Mayor Eric Adams.

Over the years, Twin Parks West became the home of a large West African and Muslim population, notably many immigrants from The Gambia, as well as smaller communities from Mali and Burkina Faso. Most of the Gambian and Gambian American residents of the building are from the same town of Allunhari (also spelled Allunhare), a community of approximately 5,500 people in the Upper River Division of The Gambia. Gambians from Allunhari began moving to the building around 1980. The leader of the local Gambian community, Abdoulie Touray, moved to Twin Parks North West, the site of the 2022 fire, in the 1970s.

=== Maintenance issues and renovations ===
In buildings under private management, tenants complained of poor maintenance, though buildings under city management drew fewer complaints. A chapter on Twin Parks in the 2015 book Affordable Housing in New York found that private managers "systematically diminished many of the innovative design characteristics of the Twin Parks complexes." Windows of common areas were replaced with steel panels, cinder blocks and bricked off; access to rooftop patios was terminated, and terraced areas were covered with concrete.

In 1974, residents of three Twin Parks' buildings complained that over the previous two years, high winds would cause apartment windows to fall out and land on the ground. The problem affected 200 windows at the project. Tenants withheld rent in protest, and the owners acknowledged the problem and said they were seeking to remedy it.

In 1977, the New York Daily News reported that Urban Development Corporation buildings, including the building that was the site of the 2022 fire, had inferior electrical wiring that could pose a fire hazard. The source of the problem was that under its mandate from the state, the UDC was not subject to building codes and other municipal regulations, and could issue its own certificates of occupancy. In a series of articles on potential fire hazards at the UDC structures, co-written by author Martin Mayer, it was noted that inspectors with the Board of Fire Underwriters found "building violations of an electrical nature" at 333 East 181st Street, the location of the 2022 fire, another Twin Parks building and other UDC properties.

The buildings of Twin Parks North West in 2013 received $39.6 million in state funding for repairs and improvements.

== 2022 fire ==
On January 9, 2022, a fire broke out at The Twin Parks North West Site 4 apartment building at 333 East 181st Street. The fire began in a third-floor duplex, and smoke spread throughout the building due to doors that did not automatically close. Seventeen residents, including eight children, died from smoke inhalation, and 44 others were injured.

The New York City Fire Department determined that the fire was caused by an electric space heater. The device had ignited a mattress after being left to run continuously for a "prolonged period." As of January 2022, the U.S. Consumer Product Safety Commission was investigating if the space heater itself had malfunctioned. One resident stated that cold indoor temperatures were an ongoing problem requiring the additional use of space heaters; while the building incurred three heating-related complaints in 2021, none were outstanding at the time of the fire. New York City housing laws require that landlords maintain indoor temperatures of at least 68 °F (20 °C) during the day, but a 2017 housing survey estimated that nearly 27% of households in the Fordham neighborhood utilized supplemental heat sources like space heaters.

== Legacy ==
A 2013 study found that the early excitement was an "opening day phenomenon," and that its "luster faded long ago" because of rampant crime. The study found that "shortly after its completion, the buildings were deemed to be a failure: they had not slowed the rapid change in their neighborhoods; stories of gang violence dominated coverage from the start.”

Writing in Affordable Housing in 2015, Yonah Freemark and Susanne Schindler concluded:

Twin Parks succeeded in creating mixed-income communities, though not racially integrated ones. It added inviting urban spaces, storefronts, and architecturally innovative buildings to the neighborhood, but these design features have been underappreciated and often undercut. Private ownership did not guarantee reliable management, nor did it offer tenants long-term confidence in housing affordability.

In 1974, Twin Parks was the subject of a Canadian documentary by filmmaker Michel Régnier.

== See also ==
- Empire State Development Corporation
- New York City Housing Authority
- Public housing
