= PMHS =

PMHS may refer to:

- Polymethylhydrosiloxane

== Schools ==
- Parramatta Marist High School, Westmead, New South Wales, Australia
- Parry McCluer High School, Buena Vista, Virginia, United States
- Pasadena Memorial High School, Pasadena, Texas, United States
- Patchogue-Medford High School, Medford, New York, United States
- Pedro Menendez High School, St. Augustine, Florida, United States
- Pelham Memorial High School, Pelham, New York, United States
- Penn Manor High School, Millersville, Pennsylvania, United States
- Pennsville Memorial High School, Pennsville, New Jersey, United States
- Perry Meridian High School, Indianapolis, Indiana, United States
- Philadelphia Mennonite High School, Philadelphia, Pennsylvania, United States
- Picayune Memorial High School, Picayune, Mississippi, United States
- Port Macquarie High School, Port Macquarie, New South Wales, Australia
