= 2022 Bronx apartment fire =

Fatal apartment fire in the Bronx, New York

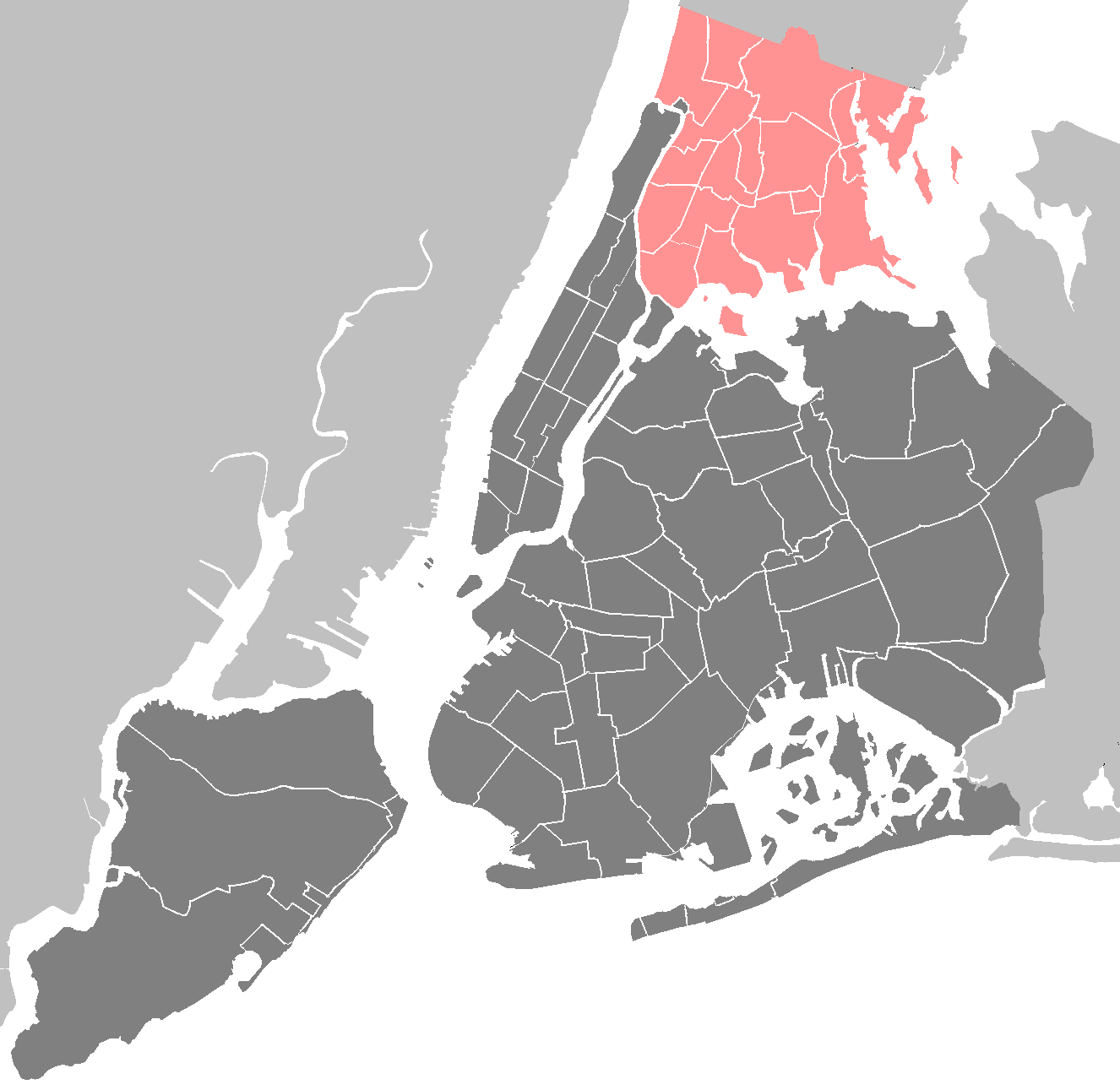
- Date: January 9, 2022
- Time: c. 10:55 a.m. (UTC−05:00)
- Location: 333 East 181st Street, Bronx, New York; 40°51′14″N 73°53′53″W
- Type: High-rise fire
- Cause: Electrical space heater
- Deaths: 17
- Injuries: 44

On the morning of January 9, 2022, a high-rise fire killed seventeen people, including eight children, at the Twin Parks North West, Site 4, high-rise apartment building in the Bronx, New York City, United States. Forty-four people were injured, and 32 with life-threatening injuries were sent to five different borough hospitals. Fifteen were in critical condition the day after the fire.

It was the third-worst residential fire in the United States in four decades, and the deadliest fire in New York City since the Happy Land nightclub fire, which occurred nearby in 1990. The Bronx fire was also the second major residential fire in the Northeastern United States within a one-week period, occurring four days after a fire in Philadelphia public housing resulted in 12 deaths.

Investigators determined that the fire was caused by a defective space heater bursting into flames. Smoke spread through the building as a result of two malfunctioning self-closing doors, causing deaths throughout the building. The fire was largely confined to one apartment; all of the persons killed in the fire died from smoke inhalation, while a dozen critically injured people were badly burned.

== Background ==
The 19-story residential building Twin Parks North West, Site 4 contains 120 apartments. It is located on 333 East 181st Street near Tiebout Avenue. It is in the central Bronx, and part of the western segment of a "scatter-site" development project spanning the Fordham, Tremont and East Tremont neighborhoods. It was built in 1972 as part of a state program to provide affordable housing. Twin Parks won architectural awards and was widely hailed at the time as the "cutting edge of urban design", though it failed to live up to its initial promise.

In 1977, the New York Daily News reported that Urban Development Corporation buildings, including the building that was the site of the 2022 fire, had inferior electrical wiring that could pose a fire hazard. The source of the problem was that under its mandate from the state, the UDC was not subject to building codes and other municipal regulations, and could issue its own certificates of occupancy. Inspectors with the Board of Fire Underwriters found "building violations of an electrical nature" at 333 East 181st Street, and another building at Twin Parks, along with other UDC properties.

Twin Parks North West, Site 4, is currently owned and operated by a private partnership between LIHC Investment Group, Belveron Partners, and Camber Property Group, which purchased it along with other Bronx buildings in early 2020. Camber's co-founders include Rick Gropper, a housing adviser to Mayor Eric Adams.

At the time of the 2022 fire, the building housed a large Muslim West African population, notably many immigrants from The Gambia, as well as smaller communities from Mali and Burkina Faso. Most of the Gambian and Gambian American residents of the building are from the same town of Allunhari (also spelled Allunhare), a community of approximately 5,500 people in the Upper River Division of The Gambia. Gambians from Allunhari began moving to the building around 1980.

== Fire ==
Just before 11 a.m. EST, an electric space heater ignited a fire in a duplex apartment on the second and third floor. The building's fire alarm system was triggered immediately. Although the first 9-1-1 calls were placed by neighbors who heard the alarms, some residents claimed that false alarms were common, and many initially believed that there was no fire or need to evacuate.

External videos
- | BBC News with Eyewitness Interviews

The fire itself was ultimately confined to the duplex apartment and the adjacent hallway, but heavy smoke quickly impeded visibility for escaping occupants. Smoke quickly spread from the unit's open door to the rest of the building, hampering other residents attempting to evacuate. Some residents recalled that the stairwells were especially lethal during the incident, and one reported "tripping over bodies."

Within three minutes, the New York City Fire Department (FDNY) and other emergency services began arriving. Rescuers found victims suffering from severe smoke inhalation on every floor of the building, some of them in cardiac or respiratory arrest. The main challenge to firefighters' progress was the massive quantity of smoke generated by the fire, which extended the entire height of the building. Many continued to work through the life-threatening conditions even after exhausting their oxygen supplies.

Around 200 firefighters responded, and the incident was ultimately upgraded to a five-alarm fire. The fire was declared under control by 3:30 p.m. Seventy-two people were taken to local hospitals, of whom 34 were under age 18.

== Victims ==
Seventeen people were killed, including eight children, while 44 people were injured; 34 of the victims were under the age of 18. About a dozen critically ill patients were transferred to specialized burn units in Manhattan, Westchester County and the Bronx after being stabilized at local hospitals. All the deaths were due to smoke inhalation, with survivors treated for that as well.

Among the victims was an entire Gambian immigrant family of five, including three children aged between 5 and 12, who fled an apartment on the top floor only to be overcome by smoke. Another family lost four members.

Identification of the dead was hampered by many not carrying identification. Tattoos, body jewelry, nail art and scars were used for identification purposes by the medical examiner’s office, as well as DNA matching. The result was a lag in identifying victims, especially children, but all of the victims were identified by January 12.

== Investigation ==
FDNY fire marshals determined that the fire was caused by an electric space heater. The device had ignited a mattress after being left to run continuously for a "prolonged period." As of January 10, 2022, the U.S. Consumer Product Safety Commission was investigating if the space heater itself had malfunctioned. One resident stated that cold indoor temperatures were an ongoing problem requiring the additional use of space heaters; while the building incurred three heating-related complaints in 2021, none were outstanding at the time of the fire. New York City housing laws require that landlords maintain indoor temperatures of at least 68 °F (20 °C) during the day, but a 2017 housing survey estimated that nearly 27% of households in the Fordham neighborhood utilized supplemental heat sources like space heaters.

The fire (and initial propagation of smoke) was stoked by the involved unit's door remaining open after its occupants had escaped. While the building was considered non-combustible and did not, nor was it required to, have sprinklers in most areas, it did conform to a 2018 city law requiring self-closing mechanisms on all apartment doors in buildings containing more than three units.

According to the property owners, maintenance staff checked the involved unit's self-closing mechanism in July 2021 and found it to be in working order. After the fire, investigators found it inoperable — along with those on several other doors throughout the building. Among the other failed mechanisms was one on a 15th-floor stairwell door; this second open door created a flue effect that rapidly accelerated the spread of heavy smoke throughout the rest of the building.

== Litigation ==
Survivors of the blaze filed two lawsuits on January 12, claiming the tragedy was preventable and was due to negligence. As of January 2022, at least one of the plaintiff's attorneys is seeking class-action status against the three owners of the complex and the city and is seeking up to $3 billion in compensatory and punitive damages for the tenants.

== Aftermath ==
In a post-incident press conference, Commissioner Nigro said that when fires occur in high-rise fireproof buildings, "people should shelter in place," and that "it’s safer to be in your apartment than to venture out and try to get down the stairs and sometimes into a much more dangerous situation".

Eric Adams, the mayor of New York City, announced that the city authorities would work to ensure Islamic funeral and burial rites for those killed in the fire would be respected, and Muslim leaders would be sought to help with the process and aid residents. The rapper Cardi B, a Bronx native, pledged to cover the funeral expenses of all 17 victims as well as repatriation costs for a number of the victims who are to be buried in Gambia.

Multiple organizations spoke out about the fire and highlighted concerns such as fire safety and fire prevention measures that have not been updated due to being constructed prior to such requirements. Other organizations used the space heater as the ignition point to highlight those that were currently living in buildings without heat that may have to utilize other means; such as a space heater for heat. U.S. Representative Ritchie Torres, representing parts of the Bronx, co-wrote the Empowering the U.S. Fire Administration Act following the fire; the legislation permitted the United States Fire Administration to help local fire departments following major fires.

The street outside Twin Parks was renamed 17 Abdoulie Touray Way on the first anniversary of the fire in 2023. The name 17 Abdoulie Touray memorializes the 17 victims of the fire, as well as the building's first Gambian resident, Abdoulie Touray.

== See also ==
- 2017 Bronx apartment fire – Fatal apartment fire in the Bronx, New York
- 2022 Philadelphia apartment fire – Fatal blaze in Pennsylvania
- Happy Land fire – 1990 arson attack in the Bronx, New York
- List of fires
- List of fires in high-rise buildings
- Twin Parks – Housing development in the Bronx, New York
