= Queen Lane Apartments =

Former public housing development in Philadelphia, Pennsylvania, United States

Coordinates: 40°1′35″N 75°10′29.1″W

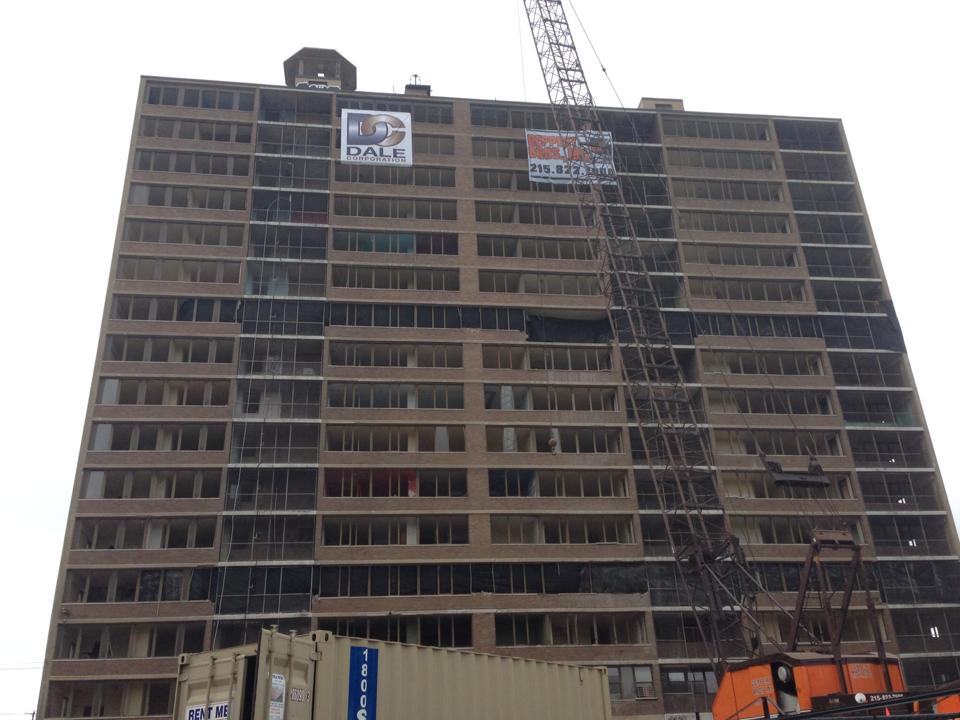
Queen Lane Apartments being prepared for demolition via implosion during the Summer of 2014.

Queen Lane Apartments opened in 1955 as one of several Post-War public housing hi-rise complexes in Philadelphia, Pennsylvania that were built and maintained by the Philadelphia Housing Authority (PHA). The PHA demolished the Queen Lane high-rise on September 13, 2014. The PHA replaced it with 55 new, affordable rental units for individuals and families. The first of the new 55 units were opened on December 15, 2015. Mayor Michael Nutter, City Council President Darrell L. Clarke, City Councilwoman Cindy Bass, PHA President/CEO Kelvin Jeremiah, residents of the nine new units, and other dignitaries joined together to cut the ribbon.

== Pre-War History of Public Housing in Philadelphia ==
Nationwide, the first public housing projects were made possible by the New Deal's Public Works Administration (PWA) program and later by the U.S. Housing Act of 1937. The Act of 1937 (also known as the Wagner‐Steagall Act), provided subsidies to construct, own and manage public housing to local public housing agencies for “families whose incomes are so low that they cannot afford adequate housing provided by private enterprise"." The United States Housing Authority (USHA) was created and empowered by Congress to “provide loans (up to 90% of development costs at 3% interest) to local government bodies or authorities to construct low‐rent housing projects. The Act included a ‘statutory cost limit per unit exclusive of land costs.’

Philadelphia was authorized to receive $20,000,000 in housing funds from the Act. Pennsylvania Legislature approved the Housing Authorities Law of Pennsylvania in an Act of Assembly on 28 May 1937. This law established public agencies known as local housing authorities, and “required a local legislative body to declare a need for a local housing authority in order for one to be created.”

The Philadelphia Housing Authority (PHA), a municipal authority providing public housing services in Philadelphia was established under the provisions on August 26, 1937. As a housing authority they were 'authorized to exercise the power of eminent domain to clear slum areas and to provide safe and sanitary dwellings through new construction or rehabilitation of existing structures.'" "Prewar PHA housing projects built between 1938 and 1941 included James Weldon Johnson Homes at 25th and Ridge Avenue, Tasker Homes at 30th and Tasker Streets, and the Richard Allen Homes at Ninth and Poplar. Philadelphia’s public housing program was halted in 1940 when the newly elected mayor Robert Lamberton rejected proposed projects and federal aid. From the onset of World War II to its end, defense housing and war housing needs for whites took precedent [sic]."

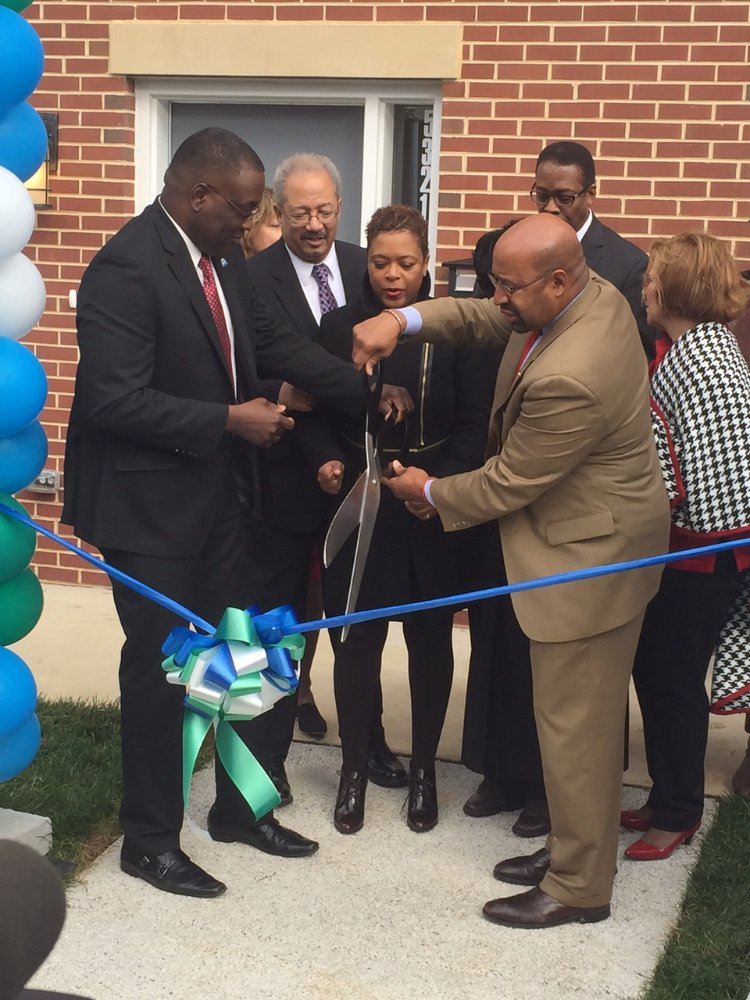
Queen Lane Ribbon Cutting - December 15th, 2015.

== History of Queen Lane Apartments ==
After World War II ended, the PHA began to select sites and conducted public hearings starting in 1950 for the several proposed public housing sites including the 16-story tower at Queen Lane. "Like most of the sites that were ultimately selected for public housing, the surrounding area was already experiencing white flight, and the PHA determined that the $1.6 million (13 million in 2014 dollars) Queen Lane Apartments would be a “nonwhite” project. The building itself, designed by architect partners Gabriel Blum Roth and Elizabeth Hirsh Fleisher, would be a single, jutting 16-story apartment block, despite its situation amongst a sea of three-story rowhouses. "Of the 10 projects designed and built between 1949 and 1955, only the 120‐unit Queen Lane in Germantown loomed as a solitary, 16‐story elevator building, uncomplemented by adjoining row house." Groundbreaking took place in 1953 and tenants began to occupy the building in 1955. "Just twenty years after Queen Lane’s opening in 1955, flaws in the high-rise, high-density construction were obvious. Devastating cuts in federal funding led to serious maintenance issues, like chronically malfunctioning elevators. Nearly everyone was dissatisfied by the 1970s. Black civil rights leaders, like Cecil B. Moore, decried horrendous living conditions and “warehousing” of the poor, black Philadelphians, while white residents staged rallies to block new PHA construction and pushed for the teardown of existing units. John Gallery, housing director for then-Mayor Frank Rizzo, stepped into this crisis and took it upon himself to commission a study of the city’s high-rise projects which were largely viewed as “the worst of worst” that public housing had to offer." Eventually, the PHA decided that the Queen Lane Apartment tower needed to come down and be replaced by low-rise affordable housing units with open green spaces and modern conveniences like in-unit washers/dryers and Energy-Star certified appliances. Former residents of the high-rise began relocating in 2011. PHA paid for the cost of the move, the security deposit, and one month's rent for residents moving to the Housing Choice Voucher (Section 8) program. The agency also reimbursed residents for reconnection of their telephone and cable TV service and provided a dislocation allowance of a hundred dollars.

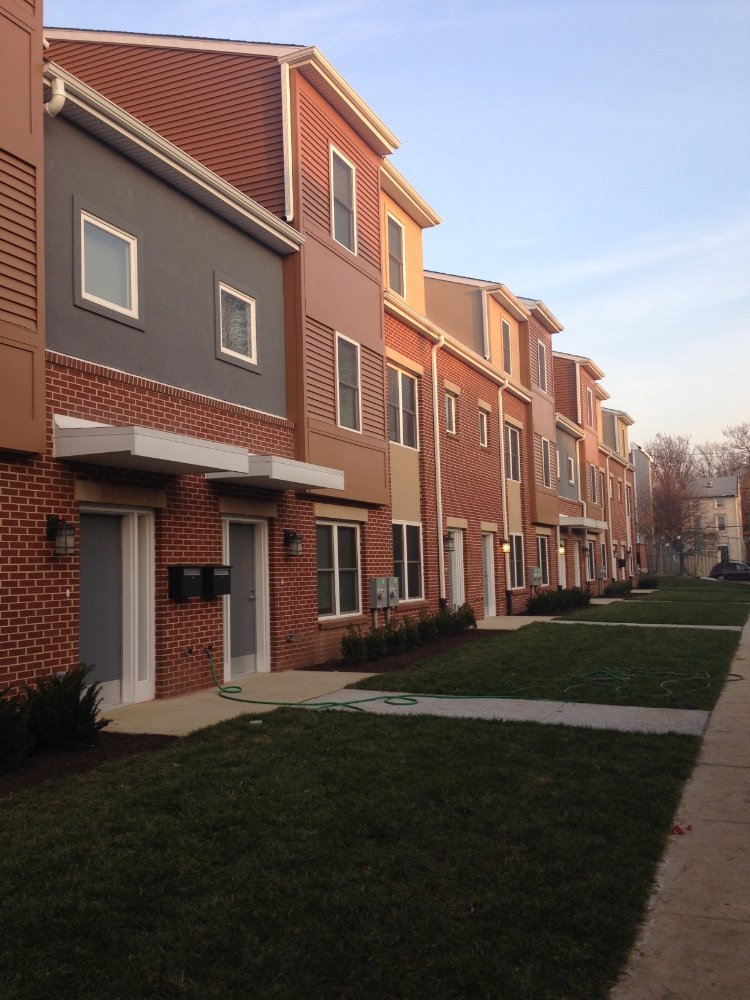
New Townhouses at Queen Lane.

== Delays Due to Potter's Field ==
Shortly after the residents moved out, the project was delayed for 27-months as a result of the discovery of a "Potter's Field" beneath the site. The bones of thousands of men and women were buried beneath a plot of land adjacent to where the Queen Lane Apartments stood. Established by the Quakers in the mid-eighteenth century, it deed reads that it was dedicated as a burying ground for African Americans, mulattoes and strangers who died in Germantown and was used until the early 20th century. This nearly led to the agency scrapping the $22 million project. The Philadelphia Housing Authority, along with the United States Department of Housing and Urban Development, Pennsylvania State Historic Preservation Society, Advisory Council on Historic Preservation, Philadelphia Historical Commission, Germantown Historical Society, Queen Lane Residents Council, Resident Advisory Board, and four other organizations executed a Programmatic Agreement on February 20, 2014 agreeing to leave the former Potter's Field as-is and to maintain it as a green space in perpetuity. Additionally, the area contained within the Potter's Field had to be legally separated from the remainder of the project and no excavation could be performed within those limits.

== Demolition and Implosion ==
The PHA awarded the demolition of the existing tower and construction of the 55 new units to Construction Manager Dale Corp, (Glenside, PA). The demolition and pre-implosion preparation was performed by Geppert Brothers (Philadelphia, PA). The loading of explosives and implosion of the tower was performed by CDI (Phoenix, MD). Preparation for the implosion started in June 2014. The tower was finally imploded at 7:15am on Saturday, September 13, 2014 to the delight of many neighbors and former residents. With the demolition of Queen Lane, PHA will have 8 high-rise sites remaining with 16 high-rises containing 1,880 units.

== Construction of New Units ==
Construction was completed by Spring 2016. The overall project consists of five buildings including fifty-five housing units, a community center, and management office set on 2.5 acres in the Germantown Section of Philadelphia. The development is currently undergoing LEED for Homes certification by USGBC and is 100% Energy Star compliant as required by HUD. As required by the Programmatic Agreement, no excavation could proceed without an archaeologist to oversee the operations and to stop excavation whenever something was encountered.
