= Puerto Rican Social Club fire =

1976 fire in New York City

Coordinates: 40.829046°N 73.916814°W

- Location: 1005 Morris Avenue, Bronx, New York City
- Date: October 24, 1976; 2:30 am (Eastern Time)
- Attack type: Arson
- Deaths: 25
- Injuries: 24
- Assailants: Jose Antonio Cordero; Francisco Mendez; Hector Lopez
- Motive: Jealousy

A fire broke out shortly after 2:30 a.m. on October 24, 1976, at the Puerto Rican Social Club in the Bronx, New York City, as a result of arson. Jose Antonio Cordero, reportedly either a jealous lover or enraged family member of a woman attending the club, offered two teenagers, Francisco Mendez and Hector Lopez, rum and marijuana in exchange for setting fire to the club. Mendez poured gasoline around the property, while Lopez set it alight. The fire spread quickly, and club patrons found the fire escape blocked by a metal door that had been installed to prevent burglaries. The fire killed 25 patrons and injured 24 others. Cordero pleaded guilty to arson, Mendez pleaded guilty to 25 counts of murder, and Lopez received a life sentence for striking the match.
