= 2017 Bronx apartment fire =

Fatal apartment fire in the Bronx, New York

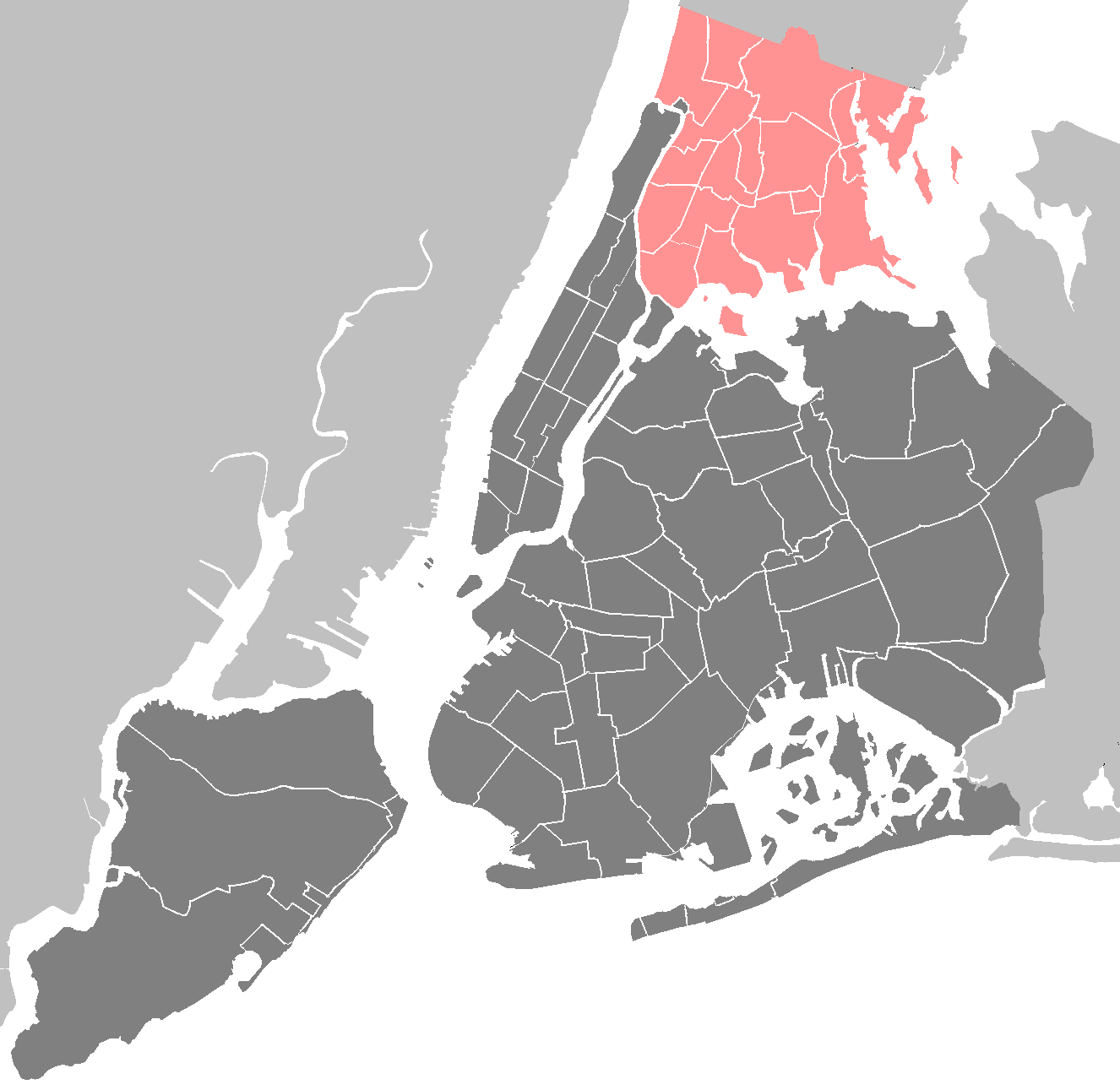
- The building's location in the Bronx, New York 2017 Bronx apartment fire (New York)
- Date: December 28, 2017
- Time: Before 7:00 p.m.
- Location: 2363 Prospect Avenue, The Bronx, New York City, New York, United States; 40.85347°N 73.88290°W
- Type: Fire
- Deaths: 13
- Injuries: 14

On the night of December 28, 2017, a fire tore through an apartment building in the Belmont neighborhood of the Bronx in New York City. Thirteen people died, and fourteen others were injured. At the time, it was the city's deadliest fire in 25 years, being surpassed a little over four years later by another apartment fire in the Bronx that killed seventeen people.

As a result of the fire, the New York City Council passed ordinances mandating self-closing doors and child-safety knobs in apartments, as well as better communication about fire safety between the New York City Fire Department and families with children.

== Building ==
The building housed 26 apartments on five floors that were connected by a central staircase, which filled with smoke early during the fire because of the open door. While the building itself did not have any New York City Department of Buildings violations, apartments 5 on the first floor and 23 on the fifth floor had faulty smoke detectors. The central section of the building's façade had a fire escape that went from the fifth floor to the second floors.

== Fire ==
Just before 7:00 p.m. EST, an unattended three-year-old child began playing with the burners on a stove in a first floor apartment at 2363 Prospect Avenue, a five-story building with 26 apartments, home to many Dominican, Trinidadian, Ghanaian, and Jamaican families.

Soon after, a fire took hold in the kitchen and the boy's screams alerted his mother, but in her hurry to get the boy and his younger sibling out, she left the door to their first-floor apartment open, which enabled the fire to breathe and spread beyond the apartment into the stairwell. The open ventilation enabled the fire to spread more quickly and pump more smoke into the hallway. As the apartment's kitchen went into flash over heat erupted from the open doorway and ignited multiple layers of oil-based paint in the main stairway. The smoke from combustibles in the apartment and the burning walls of the stairway quickly permeated the entire apartment building, and within minutes the fire department was on the scene.

Firefighters and emergency services began responding to the 4-alarm fire at 18:51. Smoke pouring into the complex was the main challenge for firefighters and civilians. "I opened the door, all I saw was black smoke..." one survivor who lived on the 1st floor told the news. The New York City Fire Commissioner compared the stairway to a "chimney" as it became a conduit for thick, toxic smoke via the stack effect. Smoke seeped into rooms through door frame and ventilation systems, setting off fire alarms throughout the complex and awaking residents.

Around 170 firefighters responded to the 5-alarm fire. Temperatures that morning were in the teens with wind chill in the single digits, requiring some firefighters to huddle together for warmth as they sprayed water on the blaze. Their quick action was credited for saving dozens of lives.

== Victims ==
Twelve people were found dead in the aftermath, with one more person dying at the hospital. The fire ultimately killed eight adults, two teenagers, and three children. All of the individuals who died on the upper floors above from where the fire started, mainly due to being obstructed by the thick smoke in the stairwell. Many residents were able to evacuate the upper floors via the fire escapes, but in the process of opening their windows gave the fire more oxygen.

A United States Army soldier from Ghana, who lived on the third floor, Pfc. Emmanuel Mensah (1990/1991 – 2017), ran back into the building after evacuating his family. He saved four others before succumbing to smoke on the fourth floor. A street was renamed after him.

== Aftermath ==
Mayor Bill de Blasio called the incident "the worst fire tragedy in at least a quarter of a century." New York City officials determined shortly afterwards that the fire had started as a result of a child playing with stove knobs.

In response to the fire, the New York City Council passed several fire safety resolutions focused on self-closing doors, improved fire alarms, and fire-safety awareness for families with children. Two bills that the Council passed in May 2018 include Int 0609-2018, which requires the fire department to create a plan on educating children and parents on fire-safety, and Int 0602-2018, which requires doors in R-1 and R-2 residential buildings to be self-closing by July 31, 2021. On November 11, 2018, the City Council also enacted Int 1256-2018, which requires "residential occupancies with three or more dwellings" in mixed-use buildings to create fire-safety plans focusing on preventative safety and escape planning for residents during a building fire.

== See also ==
- List of fires
- Skyscraper fire
