= Fairmount, Philadelphia =

Fairmount
- Neighborhood of Philadelphia
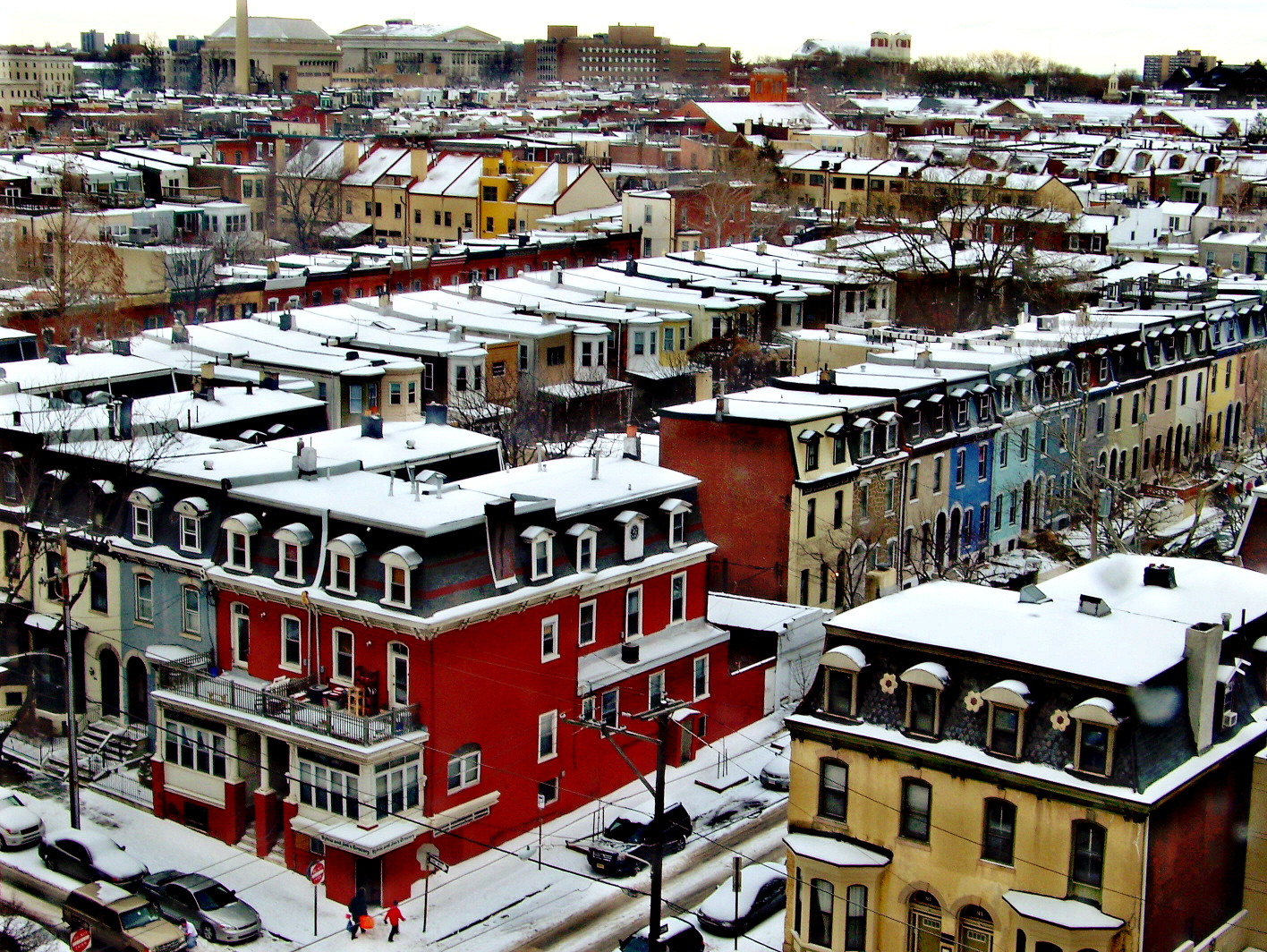
- From the 11th floor deck of 2601 Pennsylvania Ave, Overlooking 26th and Aspen Streets intersection

- Location within Philadelphia
- Country: United States
- State: Pennsylvania
- County: Philadelphia
- City: Philadelphia
- Area codes: 215, 267, and 445

Fairmount is a neighborhood within Lower North Philadelphia, Pennsylvania, United States. Its boundaries are north of Fairmount Avenue, west of Corinthian Avenue, south of Girard Avenue and east of The Schuylkill River. While this may be the most accurate demarcation, the area's boundaries fluctuate depending how the neighborhood is defined. Several other neighborhoods near Fairmount are sometimes also collectively called Fairmount, including Spring Garden, Franklintown and Francisville. Fairmount and neighboring Spring Garden are commonly referred to as the "Art Museum Area," for their proximity to and association with the Philadelphia Art Museum. Fairmount is also the location of the Eastern State Penitentiary.

The name "Fairmount" derives from the prominent hill on which the Philadelphia Museum of Art now sits and where William Penn intended to build his manor house. Later, the name was applied to the street originally called Hickory Lane that runs from the foot of Fairmount Hill through the heart of the neighborhood.

== History ==
A handful of European settlers farmed the area in the 17th, 18th, and early 19th century, when Fairmount was still outside Philadelphia's city limits. Prominent city families established country seats there as well, including Bush Hill, White Hall, and Lemon Hill, the last of which still stands overlooking the Schuylkill River. Fairmount was originally in Penn Township, which was subsequently divided, putting the future neighborhood in the newly created Spring Garden District until 1854 when it was incorporated into the City of Philadelphia.

During the American Revolution, British soldiers occupying Philadelphia built defensive works starting on the hill of Fairmount and continuing several miles along a line just south of present-day Fairmount Avenue to the Delaware River. Their purpose was to prevent American troops under George Washington from attacking them from the north, the only side of the city not protected by water.

Signs of urban expansion appeared in the early 19th century, when three large, innovative, and internationally recognized institutions were located in the district. The first of these was the Fairmount Dam and Water Works at the foot of Fairmount Hill. Beginning in 1822, the Water Works used waterpower to pump water from the Schuylkill River into reservoirs on the top of Fairmount Hill, from where it flowed by gravity into city homes and businesses. An engineering wonder, it was also an architectural and scenic attraction. Its buildings, which included a restaurant, are among the earliest examples of Greek Revival architecture in the United States. Protection of the municipal drinking water that the Water Works pumped was the impetus for the purchase of lands along the Schuylkill that later became Fairmount Park, one of the world's largest municipal park systems. Charles Dickens listed the Water Works as one of the two things he particularly wanted to see while in Philadelphia.

The other was Eastern State Penitentiary, less than half a mile away on Fairmount Avenue. The prison opened in 1829, the first prison in the country built specifically with the intention of reforming rather than simply punishing criminals. The prison's hub-and-spoke layout was also a first, and became the model for hundreds of prisons around the world (it was often called the "Pennsylvania Model"). Its unique system of solitary confinement for all prisoners did not, however. Intended to provide prisoners relief from the overcrowding and squalor of other prisons and give them time to reflect on their crimes, it led instead to intense despair and sometimes insanity among the inmates and was roundly condemned by Dickens when he visited.

In 1831, these two innovative institutions were joined by a third: Girard College. This school was founded in accordance with the will of Stephen Girard, possibly the wealthiest man in America at the time of his death. Himself an orphan, he wanted to create a model institution for educating poor orphaned white boys at a time when universal public education did not yet exist.

The executor of Girard's estate was another prominent and wealthy Philadelphian, Nicholas Biddle, former US Secretary of the Treasury, who commissioned the building of Founders Hall in honor of Girard. The Hall is an early example of true Greek Revival architecture in the United States and is, like both the Water Works and Eastern State Penitentiary, a National Historic Landmark. In 1968 Girard College entered the nation's awareness again when the United States Supreme Court altered Girard's will by striking the words "poor, male, white, orphan" and set a major precedent for equal access to education for all Americans.

These three institutions were built when Fairmount was still a rural suburban district of Philadelphia. Beginning in the 1830s, the city itself began to grow beyond its original boundaries, and a mixture of homes and factories sprang up on the district's southern fringes. The Baldwin Locomotive Works, the nation's largest maker of locomotive engines, was located on the southeastern edge of the future Fairmount neighborhood and was a major factor in development of the neighborhood south of Fairmount Avenue in the 1840s, 50s, and 60s.

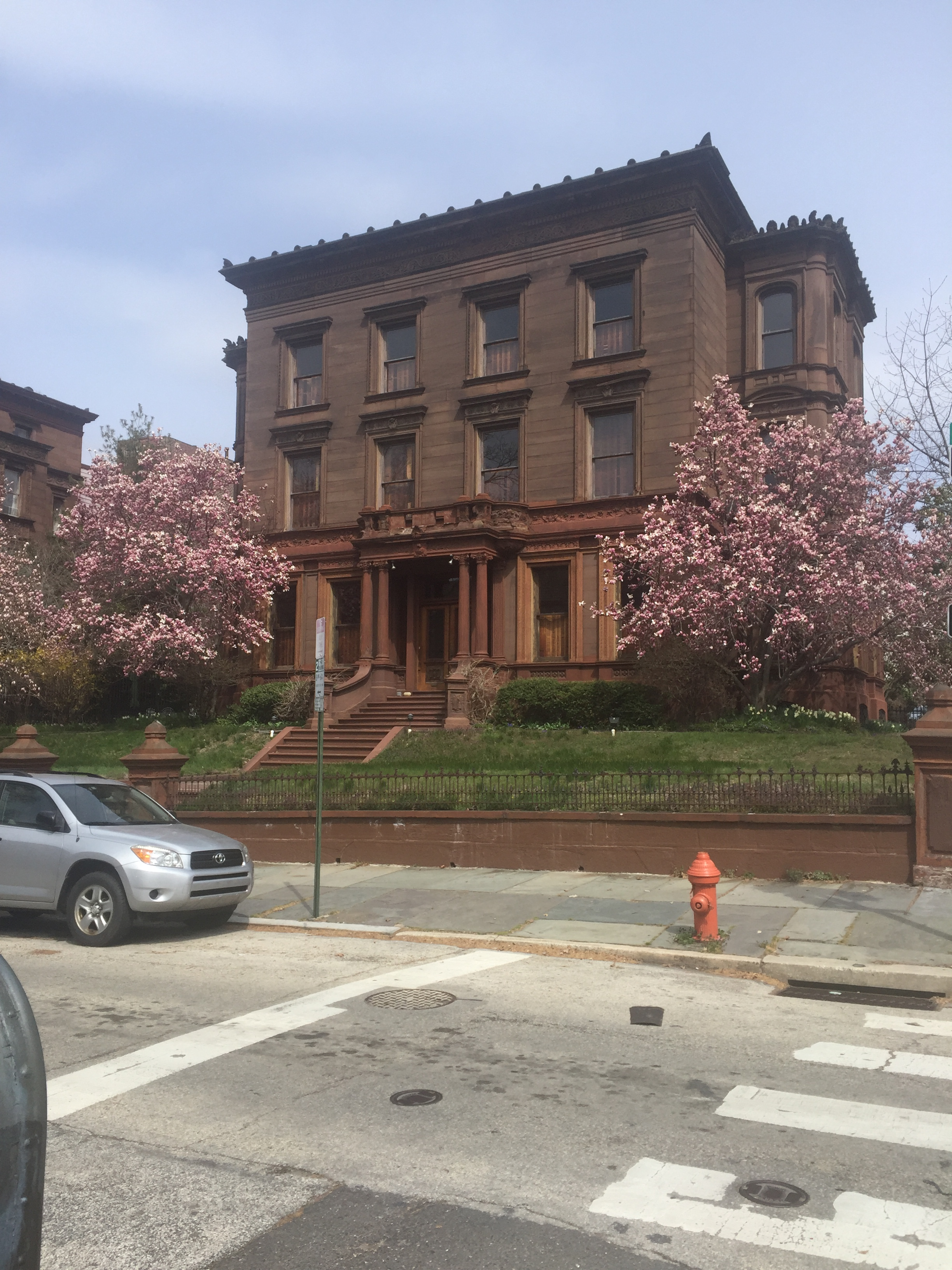
Bergdoll Mansion on 22nd and Green Streets

Fairmount's homes were generally smaller row or town houses and the residents were generally working class. Row houses were interspersed with lumber yards, coal yards, lime yards, iron foundries, bakeries, dry goods stores, as well as several wagon works and stables. Many of these were built in the second half of the 19th century to support factories and breweries in the area. Fairmount has many large houses built for the managers of the Baldwin Locomotive Works, other professionals, and brewery owners which date back to the 1840s.

Fairmount is near the Philadelphia Museum of Art, its famous "Rocky Steps" (immortalized in the 1976 Academy Award film Rocky and its new Perelman Annex). Fairmount is located at the end of the Benjamin Franklin Parkway, a broad 1.5-mile tree- and flag-lined avenue that connects City Hall to the Philadelphia Museum of Art. This stretch is known as the "Museum District" since most of the city's cultural attractions and museums are located here. Along the Parkway are the Rodin Museum, Philadelphia's Central Library, the Franklin Institute of Science, the Academy of Natural Sciences and the Barnes Museum. Based upon the famous Champs-Élysées in Paris in its design and owing to its ability to hold vast numbers of people, the Benjamin Franklin Parkway is also where most of Philadelphia's large outdoor events, parades, concerts, and races are held.

Eastern State Penitentiary, located on Fairmount Avenue, has become another main draw for the neighborhood. Tours of this historic 1829 facility, now abandoned, are offered. It is also annually converted into a haunted house during the Halloween season and, because of its resemblance to the Bastille, it is part of Philadelphia's Bastille Day celebration.

A January 5, 2022, fire in a house owned by the Philadelphia Housing Authority killed 12 people, eight of them children.

== Infrastructure and government ==
The United States Postal Service operates the Fairmount Post Office at 900 North 19th Street.

== Demographics ==
Fairmount is a predominantly white section of North Philadelphia. The neighborhood has become increasingly gentrified over the years, with newcomers to Philadelphia settling in the area for its proximity to Center City.

As of the 2000 census, the racial makeup of Fairmount, Spring Garden, and Francisville is 65.23% White, 24.24% African American, 3.93% Asian, and 4.09% from other races. 7.63% of the population are Hispanic or Latino of any race.

The population of Fairmount grew by 3% between the 1990 and 2000 censuses.

== Education ==
Fairmount is zoned to schools in the School District of Philadelphia.

Fairmount is divided between two attendance zones for Kindergarten through 8th grade:

- Bache-Martin Elementary School
- Laura Wheeler Waring Elementary School

Parents in the Fairmount neighborhood no longer have the opportunity to send children to the Albert M. Greenfield School, as the school no longer accepts applications from outside the catchment.

The neighborhood Catholic elementary school is St. Francis Xavier School.

For High School, Fairmount residents are assigned to the Benjamin Franklin High School, but many residents have historically attended Roman Catholic High School and J. W. Hallahan Catholic Girls High School.

Philadelphia Mennonite High School is a private Mennonite high school with about 100 students. It is located at 860 North 24th Street in Fairmount.

== See also ==
- Eakins Oval
- 2022 Philadelphia apartment fire, which occurred in Fairmount
