= Kelvin A. Jeremiah =

American government official

- Born: December 15, 1972 (age 53); Grenada
- Occupations: President and chief executive officer of the Philadelphia Housing Authority

Kelvin A. Jeremiah (born December 15, 1972) is an American government official. As president and chief executive officer of the Philadelphia Housing Authority (PHA), he oversees the day-to-day operations of the fourth largest housing authority in the United States. His work has emphasized education improvement and crime reduction efforts.

== Early life and education ==
Jeremiah emigrated from Grenada to the United States as a teenager in 1988. He lived with his family in Brooklyn, New York, where he attended Erasmus Hall High School. He received a Bachelor's degree in History/Business Administration from Pace University in 1995. He holds two advanced degrees, a Master of Arts in American Social History from Rutgers University and a Master of Public Administration from American International College.

== Career ==
Jeremiah began his career in public housing as a compliance officer/housing investigator with the Massachusetts Commission Against Discrimination, where he investigated discrimination allegations involving housing, public accommodations, and education. In 2004, he joined the Springfield Housing Authority in Springfield, Massachusetts, where he worked for more than two years before moving on to the New York City Housing Authority (NYCHA), the nation's largest public housing authority. In his role as inspector general at NYCHA, Jeremiah had oversight authority for the largest housing authority in North America with a $5 billion budget. He established and defined standard operating practices and provided organizational leadership to ensure peak performance and to protect against fraud, waste, and mismanagement.

Jeremiah next accepted a position at the Philadelphia Housing Authority (PHA) in August 2011. He became the agency’s first director of audit and compliance, in which he instituted policies designed to reduce waste, fraud, abuse, and mismanagement. In 2012, Jeremiah became the HUD-appointed administrative receiver and the interim executive director of PHA. He was appointed president and chief executive officer in March 2013; within his first month, the agency returned to local control.

In 2022, Jeremiah incorrectly claimed that between 2017 and 2021 PHA did not absorb the cost of incoming Housing Choice (Section 8) vouchers from out-of-town residents that opted to move to Philadelphia rather than remain in the locale where they were granted their voucher. In fact, PHA absorbed vouchers from 715 non-local families that transferred their vouchers to Philadelphia, despite PHA being under no obligation to do so and having a waiting list of 2,100 local families requesting Housing Choice vouchers.

Despite federal budget cuts, Jeremiah has committed to creating or preserving 6,000 affordable housing units in Philadelphia over a five-year period. The “6 in 5” Initiative calls for PHA to partner with public, private, nonprofit, and publicly-minded organizations to meet the huge demand for affordable housing. Since January 2014, the initiative has produced almost 3,800 housing units, including those that are planned or completed by the agency, project based units, and third party development.

The 6 in 5 Initiative includes the Sharswood/Blumberg Transformation Initiative in North Philadelphia. The first phase of this ten-phase development was completed in November 2016. As part of that first phase, Jeremiah signed the closing documents for the first ever Rental Assistance Demonstration (RAD) transaction in the City and the Commonwealth of Pennsylvania. The purpose of the RAD Program is to provide reliable, long-term, project-based rental assistance that will enable owners to leverage other public and private funding to create and support strong local communities.

PHA also signed an agreement to develop a new supermarket in the neighborhood, which has been a food desert. Lastly, the Housing Authority and the School District of Philadelphia reopened the former Vaux High School in the neighborhood in September 2017. PHA has committed to invest as much as $15 million in the restoration of the building, which is on the national record of historic sites.

Under Jeremiah, the housing authority opened a Jobs Plus program at the Raymond Rosen Community Center in North Philadelphia in mid-summer 2016. The program allows residents to conveniently access the job related services they need to get ahead economically at a “one stop” service center. PHA and its partners are investing combined resources valued at $6.79 million over the next four years, in addition to a $2.7 million grant from HUD.

At Jeremiah’s direction, PHA established PhillySEEDS, Inc. This award-winning, 501(c) non-profit corporation has produced more than $1,000,000 in scholarship money for deserving college students since 2013. The charitable organization has also provided more than 9,500 book bags stuffed with school supplies to residents, and has assisted over 30 PHA families buy their first home by providing first time homebuyer’s and closing cost assistance.

'Jeremiah worked for the Commonwealth of Massachusetts Department of Early Care and Education, formerly the Office of Child Care Services, where he was the Regional Contracts Manager and Monitoring Coordinator. He also served as Compliance Officer at the Commission Against Discrimination in Springfield, Massachusetts, where he investigated discrimination complaints involving housing, education, and public accommodation.

=== Certifications and public leadership positions ===
Jeremiah is a Certified Public Purchasing Official, a Certified Public Housing Management Specialist, and is a member of Philadelphia's Office of Community Empowerment and Opportunity Oversight Board. In October 2017, Jeremiah was appointed by Mayor Jim Kenney to the Mayor's Eviction Prevention and Response Task Force.

=== Honors ===
Philadelphia Business Journal included Jeremiah in their 2014 and 2022 lists of Most Admired CEOs. He received an honorary doctorate from Cheyney University in 2023. In 2026, Philadelphia Magazine named him among the 150 most influential Philadelphians, and he received the Drum Major Award from the Philadelphia Martin Luther King, Jr. Association for Nonviolence.

== Personal life ==
Jeremiah is married and has three children Angelina, Kevvon, and Adina.
