= Gen. John F. Reynolds School =

- U.S. National Register of Historic Places
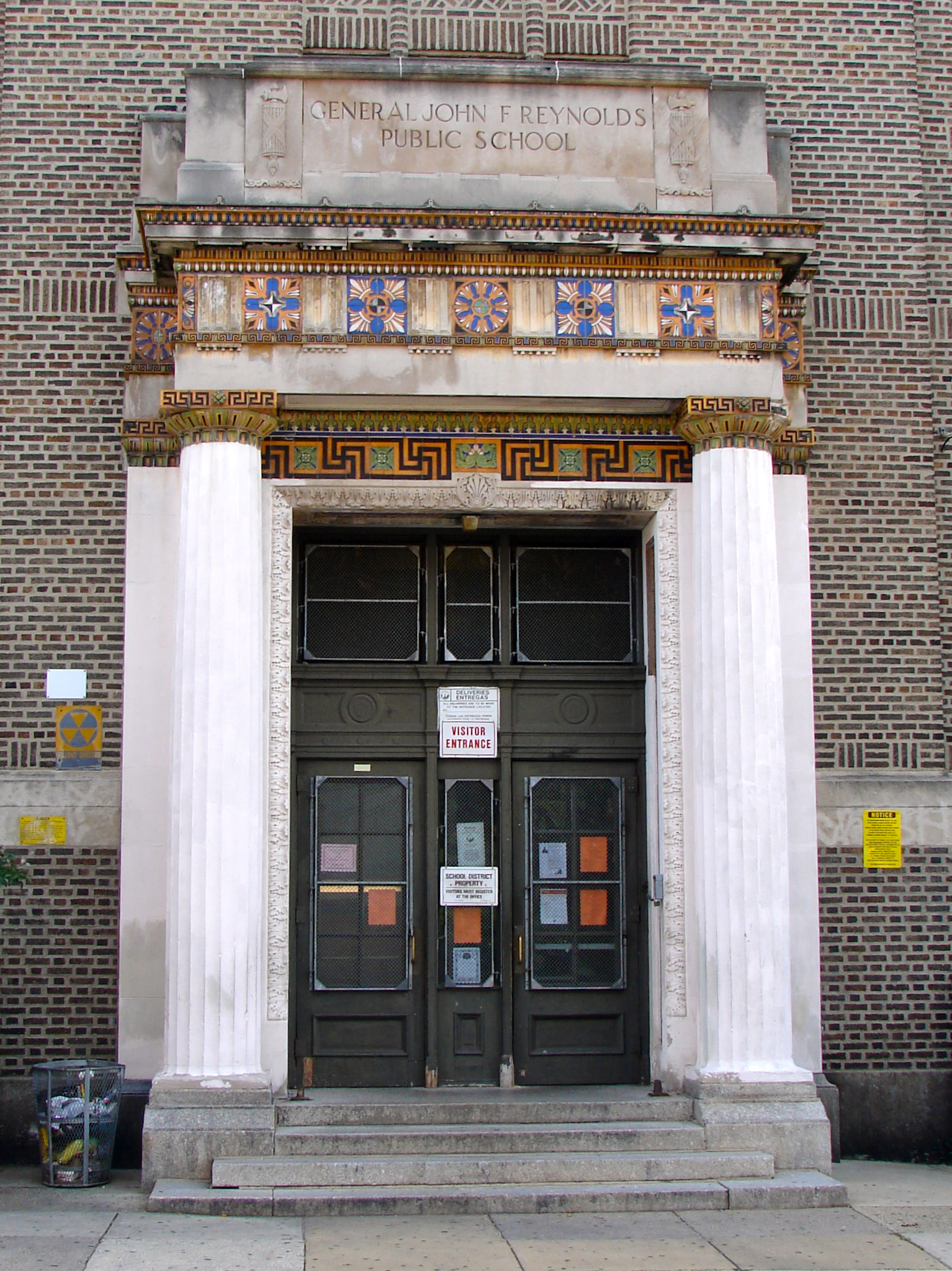
- Gen. John F. Reynolds School entrance, August 2010

- Location within Philadelphia Location within Pennsylvania Location within the United States
- Location: 2300 Jefferson St., Philadelphia, Pennsylvania
- Coordinates: 39°58′40″N 75°10′27″W
- Area: less than one acre
- Built: 1925–1926
- Architect: Irwin T. Catharine
- Architectural style: Art Deco
- MPS: Philadelphia Public Schools TR
- NRHP reference No.: 88002315
- Added to NRHP: November 18, 1988

Gen. John F. Reynolds School is a historic school building located in the North Central neighborhood of Philadelphia, Pennsylvania. It was designed by Irwin T. Catharine and built in 1925–1926. It is a four-story, 12-bay by 3-bay, brick building on a raised basement in the Art Deco-style. It has a one-story addition on the eastern side built in 1958. It features an entrance with Doric order columns and decorative terra cotta panels. It was named for Civil War General John F. Reynolds (1820–1863).

It was added to the National Register of Historic Places in 1988. The school was closed in 2013 and sold to the Philadelphia Housing Authority in 2014.
