= Allunhari =

Allunhari is a town located in eastern Gambia.It is located in Fulladu East District in the Upper River Division. As of 2008, it has an estimated population of 5,573.
