= Philadelphia Mennonite High School =

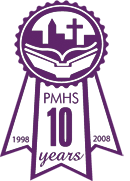

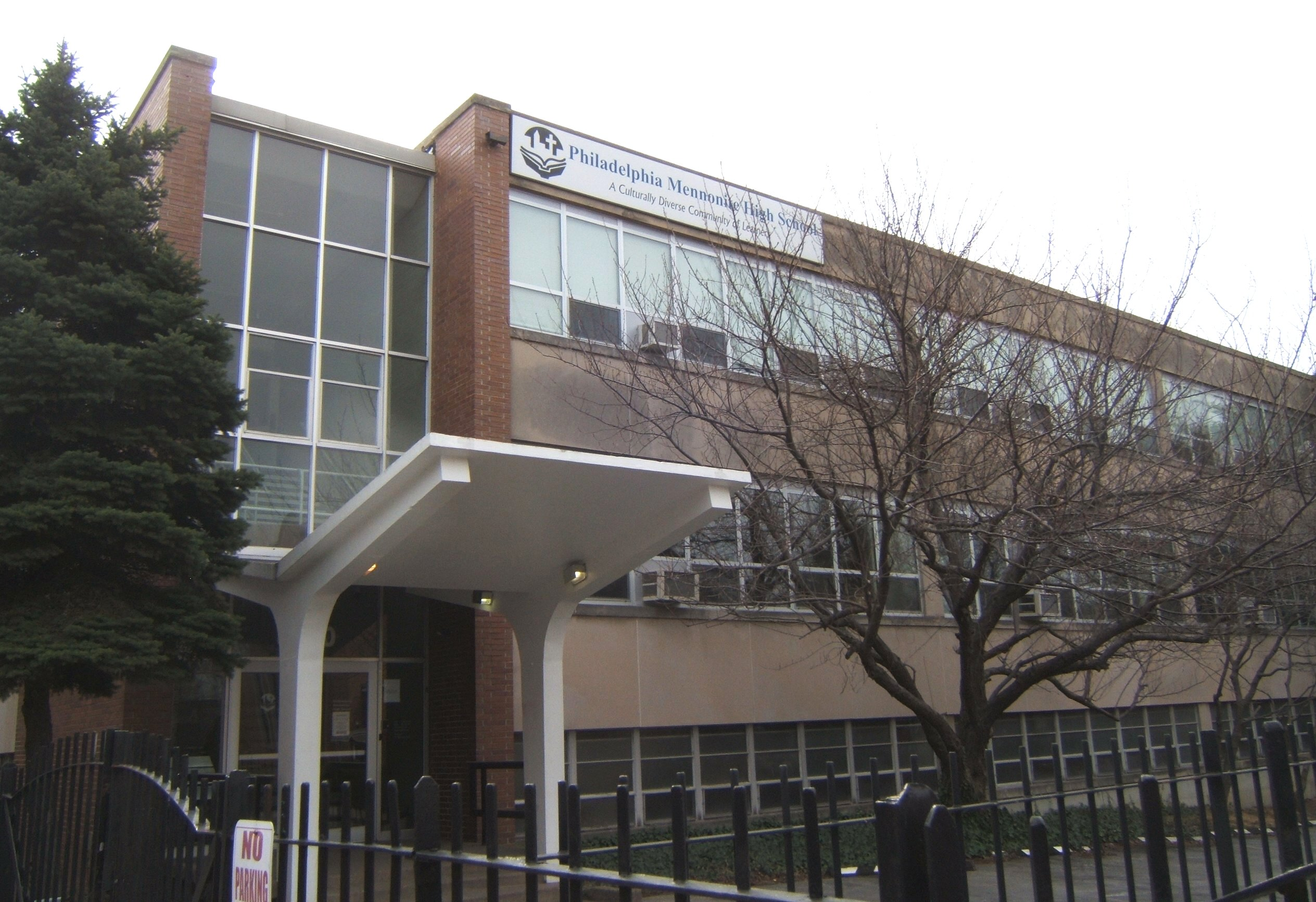
- Philadelphia Mennonite High School, Spring 2009

Location
- 860 North 24th Street; Philadelphia, Pennsylvania 19130; United States; 39.9716°N 75.1764°W

Information
- Type: Private School
- Religious affiliation: Mennonite Church USA
- Established: 1997
- Principal: Dr. Barbara Moses
- Faculty: 7
- Enrollment: 100
- Student to teacher ratio: 14:1
- Colors: Navy blue and white
- Athletics: Interscholastic Sports
- Website: www.pmhs98.org

Philadelphia Mennonite High School was a private Mennonite high school in the Fairmount neighborhood of Philadelphia, Pennsylvania. It operated from 1997 to 2014.

In 2014, the school merged with The City School, a Mennonite Lower School created by the 2006 merger of Spruce Hill Christian School and City Center Academy. Currently, the former PMHS campus is used as the Lower School campus of The City School.

== History ==
The school was founded in 1997, and opened for classes in the former St. Nicholas Ukrainian Catholic School building in the fall of 1998, with 45 students. The school had approximately 100 students in 9th through 12th grades, and focused on college preparation. The first graduating class was in 2000, with 10 students, all of whom were accepted for college admission.

== Accreditation ==
The school is accredited with two agencies, which did their evaluation process together. The agencies were the Commission on Secondary Schools of the Middle States Association of Colleges and Schools, and the Mennonite Accreditation Agency of the Mennonite Education Agency.

== Community ==
The Fairmount Civic Association met in the PMHS building, and the basement was used as a polling place for the 15th Ward, 18th Division.

The Liberti Church (Fairmount) formerly met at PMHS, and then moved to the Berean Institute. By 2023, it had returned to what was the PMHS site.
