= Philadelphia Housing Authority =

Municipal authority of Philadelphia, Pennsylvania, US

Agency overview
- Formed: 1937
- Type: Municipal Authority
- Jurisdiction: City of Philadelphia
- Headquarters: 2013 Ridge Avenue Philadelphia, Pennsylvania, U.S.
- Employees: 1,049 (see web site)
- Annual budget: $396 million
- Agency executive: Kelvin A. Jeremiah, President and CEO
- Website: http://www.pha.phila.gov/

The Philadelphia Housing Authority (PHA) is a municipal authority providing Public housing services in Philadelphia, Pennsylvania.

It is the fourth-largest housing authority in the United States and is the largest landlord in Pennsylvania. PHA houses over 76,000 people in the city of Philadelphia.

== History ==
During the Great Depression, the housing in Philadelphia for low income people, especially African Americans, was in very poor shape, and in many cases unsafe to live in. This crisis finally came to a head in December 1936 when two slum houses collapsed near 15th and Lombard, killing 6 people and injuring 20. While visiting the site of the collapse, Mayor Wilson called on governor George Howard Earle III to allow the establishment of a Housing Authority to build low cost houses in Philadelphia to replace the estimated 2000 unsafe dwellings at the time.

On January 7, 1937, members of the Mayor's Housing Committee discussed asking the Board of City Trusts for financial help in "slum clearance" and the Public Works Administration for a forty-percent grant to fund the estimated cost of such clearance. Committee members also made plans to explore with the Board of City Trusts the possibility of purchasing low interest bearing bonds that could be used to buy better housing for low income residents of the city. On January 9, housing officials from the cities of Philadelphia and Pittsburgh then met in Harrisburg to discuss ways to remove systemic obstacles that were preventing the creation of new affordable housing developments for their lower income residents, as well as improvements to existing properties that were classified as "slum" housing.

Three months later, Bernard J. Newman, Philadelphia Housing Authority managing director, reported to news media that twelve thousand houses were still unsafe for their residents and said that the city was not moving quickly enough to remedy the situation.

The Housing Authorities Law of Pennsylvania was subsequently passed by the Pennsylvania legislature in May 1937, which permitted the creation of new agencies of the state to improve housing in any cities that requested them. In June of that same year, the Committee of 70 recommended that two of the five members chosen by city officials to serve on the Philadelphia Housing Authority, upon its creation, should be an engineering with housing development experience and a financial management expert.

The Philadelphia Housing Authority was then formally established on August 26, 1937.

The mayor selected the five people to act as the first board of PHA: William Harry Barnes, James McDevitt, John McShain, Roland Randall, and Judge Frank Smith as chairman. PHA sought its initial funding from the Federal government, and during a visit to Philadelphia, the administrator of the United States Housing Authority, Nathan Straus Jr., commented that the housing in Philadelphia was the worst in the nation. By July 1938, the authority had secured the Federal funding of $16.8 million for its first three projects at Glenwood and Ridge, 30th and Tasker, and 9th and Fairmount, with the goal of rent no more than $4.50 per month. Construction of the first project officially began on May 15, 1939 at 25th and Glenwood, with the announcement that it would be named in honor of James Weldon Johnson, an African American writer and civil rights activist.

On December 17, 1937, Pennsylvania Governor George H. Earle convened a conference in Harrisburg during which housing authority officials from communities across the state discussed, and then formally launched, the state's $52,000,000 slum-clearance program. In addition to discussing "the problems of eliminating slum districts," participants also discussed ways to increase the supply of affordable housing in their communities. Civic officials from Philadelphia who were serving as members of the Governor's Housing Council at the time were Judge Frank Smith of the Common Pleas Court, Bernard Newman, chairman of the Philadelphia Housing Authority, Dorothy Schoell, executive secretary of the Philadelphia Housing Authority and assistant executive director of the State Housing Board, John Edelman, a resident of Philadelphia who was the regional director of the Committee for Industrial Organization, James McDevitt, president of the Philadelphia Building Trades Council, Norman Blumberg of the American Federation of Labor, Sydney Schulman, a Philadelphia resident who chaired the Ethical Culture Society, and Philadelphia resident Crystal Byrd Fawcett.

The Philadelphia Housing Authority is governed by a Board of Commissioners.

== Developments ==
The PHA provides two types of housing assistance: The Housing Choice Voucher program and the Public Housing Program.

The PHA operates both scattered site and condensed site public housing. Scattered site housing differs from what PHA terms "developments." They make the distinction between the two styles of public housing by the fact that developments only cater to low-income renters, while scattered site housing encompasses a mix of subsidized housing, private renters, and homeowners within the same neighborhood. Most often, the developments that PHA owns and operates are larger apartment buildings that house many residents. PHA operates three types of developments: family developments, family and senior developments, and senior developments.

== See also ==
- Queen Lane Apartments – built and maintained by the Authority
- 2022 Philadelphia apartment fire
