= Bharuch hospital fire =

2021 fire in Bharuch, India

- Date: 1 May 2021
- Time: 1 a.m. (IST)
- Location: Welfare Hospital, Bharuch, Gujarat, India
- Type: Fire
- Cause: Short circuit (under investigation)
- Deaths: 18

On 1 May 2021, a fire in a hospital in Bharuch, Gujarat, India, killed at least 16 COVID-19 patients and 2 nurses.

== Background ==
India is badly affected by the COVID-19 pandemic and facing a second wave of the pandemic. On 23 April 2021, 13 COVID-19 patients in a hospital in Virar, Maharashtra, died after a fire broke out at the intensive care unit (ICU) of the hospital.

== Incident ==
In the early hours of 1 May 2021, at 1 a.m., a fire broke out in the COVID-19 ward of Bharuch Welfare Hospital, a COVID-19 designated hospital, located around 190 km from Ahmedabad, Gujarat.

== Aftermath ==
The Prime Minister of India, Narendra Modi expressed his deep condolences by saying, Pained by the loss of lives due to a fire at a hospital in Bharuch. The Chief Minister of Gujarat, Vijay Rupani announced ex-gratia aid of ₹4 lakh (US$4,200) for kin of victims.

== See also ==
- 2021 Baghdad hospital fire
- Gaziantep hospital fire
- Matei Balș hospital fire
- Piatra Neamț hospital fire
- Virar hospital fire
