= Disability in Romania =

Disability in Romania describes the lived realities of almost 900 000 people—around one in twenty residents—who hold an official disability certificate, three-quarters of whom are women or girls and roughly 77 000 of whom are children.

== Demographics ==
Official registers counted 898 349 certified disabled persons in June 2023, of whom 8.6 percent lived in residential care and the rest in the community. Eurostat’s EU-SILC shows that 38.2 percent of Romanians with a disability were at risk of poverty or social exclusion in 2023, compared with 27.5 percent of their non-disabled peers, the third-largest gap in the EU. Material-and-social deprivation affected 28.4 percent of disabled Romanians—more than double the EU average—while only 17 percent of those aged 20-64 were in paid work, the lowest share in the Union.

== Legislation and government policy ==
Article 50 of the Constitution of Romania guarantees “special protection” for persons with disabilities, a promise fleshed out by Framework Law 448/2006 on the Protection and Promotion of the Rights of Disabled Persons, repeatedly amended since EU accession and still the cornerstone of domestic disability law. Romania ratified the United Nations Convention on the Rights of Persons with Disabilities (CRPD) in 2010 and adopted a participatory National Strategy for the Rights of Persons with Disabilities 2022–2027, its first to embed CRPD principles in measurable targets.

For disabled students, Law 448/2006 grants the right to attend school alongside non-disabled peers, with appropriate accommodations. However, lack of trained teaching staff can prevent true inclusion.

Law 448/2006 also grants disabled people the right to work, either in a regular workplace that has been made accessible or in a protected unit that specifically employs disabled workers. However, labor market integration for disabled Romanians has been decreasing compared to other groups, and many are reliant on disability compensation benefits.

== Politics ==
Civil-society advocacy relies on bodies such as the National Council of Disability and on strategic litigation. A 2023 EIN workshop in Bucharest documented persistent legal incapacitation, inaccessible polling stations and the absence of alternative voting formats, issues that the government began to test-address only in April 2025 through a tactile-and-audio ballot for blind voters.

== Disability benefits ==
All certified disabled adults receive a monthly payment levels of which rise with the severity of impairment. Government data submitted to the European Social Charter show the top-tier indemnity climbing from 350 RON in 2021 to 368 RON in 2023, while the complementary budget for children with “high disability” rose from 175 RON to 316 RON over the same period; medium-tier rates saw proportional increases.

== Deinstitutionalisation ==
Thousands of disabled people in Romania live in institutions. As of 2023, there were 16,000 adults in residential facilities, and an unknown number institutionalised in hospitals or psychiatric wards. Many of these individuals have intellectual disability.

Disabled people in Romania, such as Elisabeta Moldovan, have worked with international advocacy groups like Inclusion Europe to explain the harms caused by institutions and advocate for other forms of care.

The 2022-2027 National Strategy includes a target of 11,500 adults in institutions by 2026.

== See also ==
- Healthcare in Romania
- Health in Romania
