= 2021 Tetovo hospital fire =

2021 fire in Tetovo, North Macedonia

Tetovo hospital fire
- Date: 8 September 2021
- Time: ~21:02 (CET)
- Location: Tetovo, Tetovo Municipality, North Macedonia
- Type: Fire
- Deaths: 14
- Injuries: 12

On the evening of 8 September 2021, a fire broke out in the modular hospital for COVID-19 patients in Tetovo. The fire killed 14 people, 12 of whom were patients and two were relatives of the patients. The security camera footage of the fire has showed that the fire spread rapidly and engulfed the hospital.

== Background ==
The hospital was constructed as a temporary facility in 2020 to care for people seriously ill from the coronavirus. Such hospitals were set up across North Macedonia over 2020, funded by a World Bank loan, to tackle surging coronavirus hospitalizations and a shortage of hospital beds.

== Fire ==
There were 26 patients at the time of the fire. 12 patients were also injured and rescued from the blaze, they were sent to the hospital’s emergency section. The fire was extinguished by firefighters, with the help of civilians.

== Aftermath ==
The Macedonian government declared three days of national mourning, with flags flying at half-mast.

Immediately after the incident, the Macedonian government claimed that the hospital was "built in accordance with all designated procedures and standards" and an investigation was launched. The government accepted an offer from other NATO allies to send fire experts and a team from Germany’s Federal Criminal Police Office also participated in the investigation.

On 10 September, two days after the fire, the Minister of Health Venko Filipče, the Deputy Minister Ilir Hasani, the director of the Tetovo hospital Florin Besimi and the economic director of the hospital Artan Etemi resigned. On 17 September, a protest in Tetovo was organized by the victims' families. The protesters were in front of the local government building, throwing eggs and demanding the resignation of Tetovo’s mayor, Teuta Arifi. Scuffles between police and protesters broke out in front of the Democratic Union for Integration's headquarters. Four police officers were slightly injured and two protesters were arrested. The German side completed the investigation in four months and sent their report on the incident to the prosecutors in January 2022, they determined that the cause of the fire was an electrical short circuit in a faulty electrical extension cord that had been used in the hospital to connect a defibrillator machine.

On 27 July, charges were pressed against the former director of the hospital, the official in charge of the hospital's technical side and the medical doctor on duty during the incident in relation to the fire. Two criminal indictments were raised against the hospital as a legal subject as well. In June 2023, the Tetovo Basic Court found the former director of the hospital and the official in charge of the technical side of the hospital guilty of endangering public safety for not acquiring fire extinguishers, giving them suspended prison sentences of one year and a half. The doctor was acquitted of any wrongdoing. The court also found the hospital guilty of endangering public safety and disregarding health protocols, ordering it to pay 1,000,000 denars (around 16,000 euros) as compensation. The first trial was annulled by the Appeal Court in Gostivar. In a retrial on 16 May 2025, a court in Tetovo found 2 former hospital directors guilty of "serious crimes against public safety" for not acquiring the fire extinguishers and sentenced them to a year and a half in prison.

== See also ==
- COVID-19 pandemic in North Macedonia
- List of building or structure fires
- Matei Balș hospital fire
- Gaziantep hospital fire
