= 2021 Baghdad hospital fire =

Fire in Baghdad, Iraq started by exploding oxygen tanks

Baghdad hospital fire
- Date: 24–25 April 2021
- Location: Baghdad, Iraq; 33°13′27″N 44°30′40″E
- Type: Fire
- Deaths: 92
- Injuries: 110

On the night of 24 to 25 April 2021, a fire at the Ibn al-Khatib hospital in Baghdad, Iraq, left at least 92 people dead and 110 others injured. The fire was started by the explosion of oxygen tanks designated for COVID-19 patients. A lack of fire detection and suppression systems contributed to the spread of the fire, and many died as a result of being taken off their ventilators to escape. The disaster led to calls for accountability, and the Minister for Health, Hassan al-Tamimi, was suspended by Prime Minister Mustafa al-Kadhimi the following day.

== Background ==
The COVID-19 pandemic put a large strain on Iraq. As of April 2021, more than a million cases had been recorded in the country, more than in any other Arab state. The public was skeptical about COVID-19 vaccines, and many were reluctant to wear masks during the pandemic.

Ibn al-Khatib was one of three hospitals in Baghdad that were designated at the beginning of the pandemic by the Iraqi Ministry of Health to treat COVID-19 patients. The hospital served one of the poorer neighbourhoods of Baghdad, and a spokesperson for the health ministry stated that it was originally built in the 1950s and was renovated the previous year to treat coronavirus patients.

Patients in intensive care at the hospital were given respirators to assist breathing, and would have been difficult to transport in the event of a fire.

The European Commission released a report earlier in 2021 warning of the increased risk of hospital fires due to the use of supplemental oxygen in wards treating COVID-19 patients.

== Fire ==
External image
- A hallway of the hospital after the fire

On the night of 24 April 2021, an accident occurred in the hospital's intensive care unit (ICU) that caused an oxygen tank to explode. Medical sources told Agence France-Presse that the accident was caused by "a fault in the storage of oxygen cylinders". A doctor reported that the staff had tried to shut down the hospital's central oxygen system, but the oxygen tanks had already started exploding. The explosions set off a fire in the ICU that spread quickly to multiple floors during the night. At the time of the fire, it was believed that at least 120 patients were in the hospital, a doctor disclosed. Major General Khadhim Bohan, head of Iraq's Civil Defence, stated that the hospital had neither smoke detectors, nor a sprinkler system, nor fire hoses, and that flammable material used in the dropped ceiling of the ICU contributed to the speed at which the fire spread.

The ICU, reserved for the most severe cases of COVID-19, had about 30 patients, and dozens of their relatives were visiting at the time. One witness, who was visiting his brother in the hospital, stated that he saw people jumping out of windows to escape the fire.

Iraq's Civil Defence stated that the fire was under control by the early morning hours of 25 April.

== Casualties ==
At least 92 people died as a result of the fire. The Iraqi High Commission for Human Rights reported that 28 of the fatalities were COVID-19 patients being treated in wards at the ICU who had to be taken off their ventilators to escape the fire when it had reached their ward. Others had died of smoke inhalation. According to the pharmaceutical association of Iraq, at least one pharmacist was among the fatalities. At least 110 other people were injured. A reporter for Al Jazeera stated that the number of fatalities was likely to rise because many of those injured had suffered severe burns.

== Aftermath ==
With a health system already strained by poor infrastructure and the COVID-19 pandemic, the fire, which was attributed to negligence often associated with widespread government corruption, sparked anger among the public and led to calls for accountability, including demands for the firing of Hassan al-Timini, the Minister of Health. The governor of Baghdad, Mohammed Jaber, called for the health ministry to establish a commission to bring those responsible to justice. Although several patients were relocated to other hospitals, many families decided to wait outside Ibn al-Khatib after the fire was extinguished, in an attempt to search for their loved ones.

On 25 April, Prime Minister Mustafa al-Kadhimi held an emergency meeting where he ascribed the fire to negligence, and ordered authorities to report the results of an investigation "within 24 hours". Al Jazeera reported that the announcement did not stop criticism from those on social media, as Iraqis repeatedly hear of the government declaring investigations but rarely see anyone being held accountable.

Al-Kadhimi also ordered the detention of the head of the hospital and the head of its department of engineering and maintenance, as well as the detention and questioning of the health director for the area of Baghdad where the hospital was located. He also suspended the Baghdad governor as well as Health Minister Hassan al-Timini and planned to question them as well. Kadhimi instructed that the investigation be concluded within a period of five days, as well as the submission of a report to the Council of Ministers, according to CNN.

On the same day, al-Kadhimi declared a three-day national mourning period. He also stated that the family members of each victim would receive 10,000,000 IQD (5,700 EUR).

Several countries worldwide issued condolences to the people of Iraq. (Note: Egypt, Saudi Arabia, Turkey, and the United Arab Emirates.)

Some medical staff, witnesses, and family members who lost their loved ones said that the fire extinguishers were not functional. They criticized the Iraqi healthcare system, which they believe had been subjected to mismanagement for years.

== See also ==
- Gaziantep hospital fire
- Matei Balș hospital fire
- Nasiriyah hospital fire
- Piatra Neamț hospital fire, another fire that broke out in a COVID-19 ward and was exacerbated due to the use of supplemental oxygen
- Virar hospital fire
