= Nasiriyah hospital fire =

Hospital fire in Iraq

Al-Hussein Teaching Hospital fire
- Location of Dhi Qar Governorate in Iraq
- Date: 12 July 2021
- Venue: Al-Hussein Teaching Hospital
- Location: Nasiriyah, Nasiriyah District, Dhi Qar Governorate, Iraq
- Type: Fire
- Deaths: 60
- Injuries: 100

A fire occurred at an Al-Hussein Teaching Hospital for COVID-19 isolation ward in Nasiriyah, Nasiriyah District, Dhi Qar Governorate, Iraq, on 12 July 2021. The fire left at least 60 people dead and another 100 were injured.

== Background ==
The newly constructed 70-bed ward at Nasiriyah's Al-Hussein Teaching Hospital was an attempt to alleviate poor conditions following years of violence that impacted on the Iraqi healthcare system. In April 2021, a fire swept through a coronavirus ward in Baghdad, leaving more than 80 people killed.

== Fire ==
On 12 July 2021, a fire erupted in a COVID-19 quarantine facility, at the Al-Hussein hospital in the city of Nasiriyah. A medic at the hospital who spoke to Reuters on the condition of anonymity, suggested that the hospital was lacking in safety measures such as a fire alarm or sprinkler system. Reports have shown that the fire was triggered by an electrical cable that was faulty, exacerbated by oxygen cylinders which may have possibly exploded. Firefighters and rescuers were seen searching through the hospital ward overnight, with victims' remains spread outside the hospital afterward.

Also on 12 July, a small fire was reported to have erupted at the headquarters of the Iraqi health ministry, but no casualties were recorded as the fire was put out immediately.

== Casualties ==
As of 13 July, at least 92 people were said to have been killed in the devastating fire at the hospital in southern Iraq. More than 100 people were reportedly wounded in the fire at Nasiriyah's al-Hussein Teaching Hospital, according to Euronews. Several COVID-19 patients who were on respirators asphyxiated or got burnt, as a result of the fire. Meanwhile, regional officials as of 17 July, placed the death toll at 60, despite earlier reports suggesting 92.

== Aftermath ==
Two police vehicles were reportedly set ablaze by angry relatives of the victims, as they clashed with the Iraqi police. According to BBC, 13 arrest warrants had been issued out, following the horrific event at the Nasiriyah teaching hospital. The Iraqi Prime Minister Mustafa al-Kadhimi ordered the suspension and detention of the heads of civil defense and health in Nasiriyah, after his emergency meetings with senior officials. The director of the al-Hussein Teaching Hospital was also said to have been among those whose arrest warrants were issued by the PM. President Barham Salih urged for accountability for those who were behind the incident, which he blamed on mismanagement and corruption.

== International reactions ==
Following the unfortunate event, Saudi Arabia's King Salman offered his sympathy to the Iraqi President Barham Salih. The UN Special Envoy to Iraq, Jeanine Hennis-Plasschaert, also extended her condolences to families of the victims and called for the provision of a safer hospital environment.

== See also ==
- 2021 Baghdad hospital fire
