= General Household Survey (United Kingdom) =

The General Household Survey (GHS) was a survey conducted of private households in Great Britain by the Office for National Statistics (ONS). The aim of this survey was to provide government departments and organisations with information on a range of topics concerning private households for monitoring and policy purposes.

The Survey was last run in 2007. Thereafter, its questions were taken over by the General Lifestyle Survey, which was in turn ended in January 2012.

== History ==
The GHS has been carried out continuously between 1971 and 2007 except for two breaks in 1997-1998 and in 1999-2000 when the survey was reviewed and redeveloped. From 2000 onwards, the design has been changed and, at the time of its termination, the survey had two different elements: The continuous survey, which remained unchanged over a five-year period, and extra modules called "trailers". This structure allowed different trailers to be included each year, depending on what information the sponsoring government departments require.

In 2005, further changes were introduced and the time period in which the survey is conducted was changed from the financial year (April to March) to the calendar year (January to December). Additionally, the design was changed to a longitudinal survey in 2005-2006 because the European Union (EU) required all member states to collect extra data from a Survey on Income and Living Conditions (EU-SILC).

The topics included in the questionnaire covered general information such as demographic information about household members, housing tenure, consumer durables including vehicle ownership and migration. The individual questionnaires, completed by all adults over 16 years of age resident in a household, also included issues such as employment, pensions, education, health, smoking and drinking, family information and income.

== Methodology and scope ==
The GHS was a repeated cross-sectional study, conducted annually, which uses a sample of 9,731 households in the 2006 survey. The data were primarily collected by face-to-face interviews as well as telephone interviews.
