= List of hospitals in Romania =

The list below is a database that contains hospitals in Romania. All public hospitals receive funding from the Ministry of Health. Romania has a universal healthcare system, hence all public hospitals are charge-free and available to each citizen of the European Union. There are 425 operational hospitals across the country. At the moment, there are 6.2 hospital beds available per 1000 citizens.

As a result of the European recession, the executive has decided to shut down 67 hospitals nationwide.

== Classification ==
In Romania, each hospital is assigned to a certain city, town, region or medical university.

A dispensary (dispensar in Romanian) is common out in the countryside. They do not have the facilities or labor power of a hospital, but some famous dispensaries appear in the list below.

A town hospital (spital orășenesc in Romanian) is a hospital where residents of a particular town are being admitted into. Such hospitals are able to sustain most medical emergencies and common surgeries.

A municipal hospital (spital municipal in Romanian) is a hospital where residents of a particular municipality are being admitted into. Such hospitals usually have a greater bed capacity than a town hospital.

A county hospital (spital județean in Romanian) is a hospital where citizens from all over the county are being brought in. If the procedure cannot be performed into a town hospital, the patients are being admitted in a hospital as such. This kind of hospital has a wide range of departments and a high bedding capacity.

A university hospital (spital universitar in Romanian) is a hospital ascribed to a medical university. Such hospitals have a state-of-the-art medical technologies and tend to perform experimental operations.

A sanatorium (sanatoriu in Romanian) is a recovery facility where patients with a chronic disease are being admitted into shortly before treatment.

A private hospital is a hospital that only operates with people that own a private medical insurance. Such hospitals have a closed circuit network and differ from the public hospitals.

== Active hospitals ==
This list has been created with information provided by the Romanian Ministry of Health.

County	Location	Full name	Total capacity (hospital beds)	Founding year
Alba	Aiud	Aiud Tuberculosis Hospital	220	1914
Alba	Aiud	Aiud Municipal Hospital	225	1867
Alba	Alba Iulia	Alba Iulia Emergency County Hospital	763	1973
Alba	Blaj	Blaj Municipal Hospital	40	1951
Alba	Câmpeni	Tuberculosis Sanatorium Câmpeni		1937
Alba	Câmpeni	Câmpeni Town Hospital	155	
Alba	Cugir	Cugir Town Hospital		
Alba	Sebeș	Sebeș Municipal Hospital	301	
Alba	Zlatna	Zlatna Town Hospital		
Arad	Arad	Dr. Salvator Vuia Clinical Hospital of Obstetrics-Gynecology	60	1919
Arad	Arad	Arad County Emergency Clinical Hospital	631	1981
Arad	Arad	Arad County Clinical Hospital	340	1775
Arad	Capalnas	Capalnas Psychiatric Hospital	85	
Arad	Chișineu-Criș	Sf. Gheorghe Hospital	90	2003
Arad	Dezna	Dr. Corneliu Bârsan Neurological rehabilitation Hospital		
Arad	Gurahonț	Gurahonț Territorial Tuberculosis Hospital	100	2011
Arad	Ineu	Ineu Town Hospital	100	1855
Arad	Lipova	Lipova Town Hospital	110	1906
Arad	Mocrea	Mocrea Psychiatry Hospital		1834
Arad	Sebiș	Chronic diseases Sebiș Hospital		1968
Argeș	Călinești	Ion Crăciun Hospital	70	1884
Argeș	Câmpulung Muscel	Câmpulung Muscel Municipal Hospital	390	1983
Argeș	Costești	King Carol I Municipal Hospital	140	1918
Argeș	Curtea de Argeș	Curtea de Argeș Municipal Hospital	215	1981
Argeș	Domnești	Dr. Teja Papahagi Town Hospital	55	
Argeș	Mioveni	Sf. Spiridon Town Hospital	87	1894
Argeș	Pitești	Pitești Pediatric Hospital	396	
Argeș	Pitești	Pitești County Emergency Hospital	1019	
Bacău	Bacău	Bacău Pediatrics Hospital	293	2003
Bacău	Bacău	Bacău County Hospital	1,182	1857
Bacău	Buhuși	Buhuși Town Hospital	173	
Bacău	Comănești	Ioan Lascăr Town Hospital	120	1931
Bacău	Moinești	Moinești Municipal Hospital	388	1973
Bacău	Onești	Onești Municipal Hospital	573	1965
Bacău	Podu Turcului	Podu Turcului Communal Hospital		
Bacău	Târgu Ocna	Târgu Ocna Town Hospital		
Bihor	Aleșd	Aleșd Town Hospital	135	1955
Bihor	Beiuș	Beiuș Municipal Hospital	245	1890
Bistrița	Beclean	Beclean Town Hospital	244	
Bistrița	Bistrița	Bistrița Năsăud County Emergency Hospital	1,197	
Bistrița	Năsăud	Dr. George Trifon Town Hospital	165	1950
Botoșani	Botoșani	Botoșani County Emergency Hospital Mavromati		
Botoșani	Botoșani	Botoșani Pneumology Hospital		
Brașov	Brașov	Brașov County Emergency Clinical Hospital	915	1973
Buzău	Buzău	Buzău County Emergency Hospital		
Cluj	Cluj-Napoca	Cluj County Emergency Clinical Hospital	1,592	1948
Cluj	Turda	Turda Municipal Hospital		
Cluj	Câmpia Turzii	Câmpia Turzii Municipal Hospital		
Cluj	Huedin	Huedin City Hospital		
Cluj	Cluj-Napoca	Cluj-Napoca Infectious Diseases Clinical Hospital		
Cluj	Cluj-Napoca	Dr.Constantin Papilian Emergency Military Hospital		
Constanța	Constanța	Constanța County Emergency Hospital		
Dolj	Craiova	Clinical Emergency County Hospital Craiova	1,488	
