= Constanța hospital fire =

2021 fire in Constanța, Romania

- Date: 1 October 2021
- Time: ~09:48 (EET)
- Duration: Less than 1 hour
- Venue: Constanța Hospital for Infectious Diseases
- Location: Constanța, Romania; 44°10′16.25″N 28°38′16.91″E
- Type: Fire
- Deaths: 7

On 1 October 2021, at around 09:48 EET, a fire was reported to have started in the Constanța Hospital for Infectious Diseases at Constanța, Romania. Firefighters arrived at the scene at 09:56 EET, extinguishing the fire in less than an hour, at 10:50 EET.

== Hospital ==
According to two analyzes of the Constanța Hospital for Infectious Diseases that had been carried out before the fire, the hospital had several problems. It had been built in 1938, had an old infrastructure and was constantly subject to reforms. Furthermore, it lacked a fire safety system, had an insufficient and exhausted personnel and many patients had no health insurance, along various other issues.

== Fire ==
At the moment of the fire, there were about 125 patients in the hospital. 10 of them were located on an intensive care unit (ICU) for treatment against COVID-19. Although local media originally reported ten deaths and the Constanța County Prefecture stated that nine people had died in the fire, this figure was later confirmed to be of seven people, with five dying during the fire and two passing out later in other hospitals to which they were transferred. All of the deceased were patients hosted in the ICU.

== Aftermath ==
The event caused outrage in Romania and the authorities were accused of incompetence, as two hospital fires with several deaths had already occurred within the 12 previous months in the country, the first one being the November 2020 Piatra Neamț hospital fire and the second being the January 2021 Matei Balș hospital fire. The President of Romania, Klaus Iohannis, released a statement on the event, sending condolences to the relatives of the victims and stating that the Romanian state had failed in its mission to protect its citizens, criticizing the situation of the infrastructure of the country's health system and asking the Prime Minister and Ministry of Health of Romania that measures be taken to prevent another similar accident. The President of Moldova, Maia Sandu, also sent her condolences to the relatives of the victims of the fire.

== See also ==
- COVID-19 pandemic in Romania
- List of building or structure fires
- Piatra Neamț hospital fire
- Matei Balș hospital fire
