= Health in Romania =

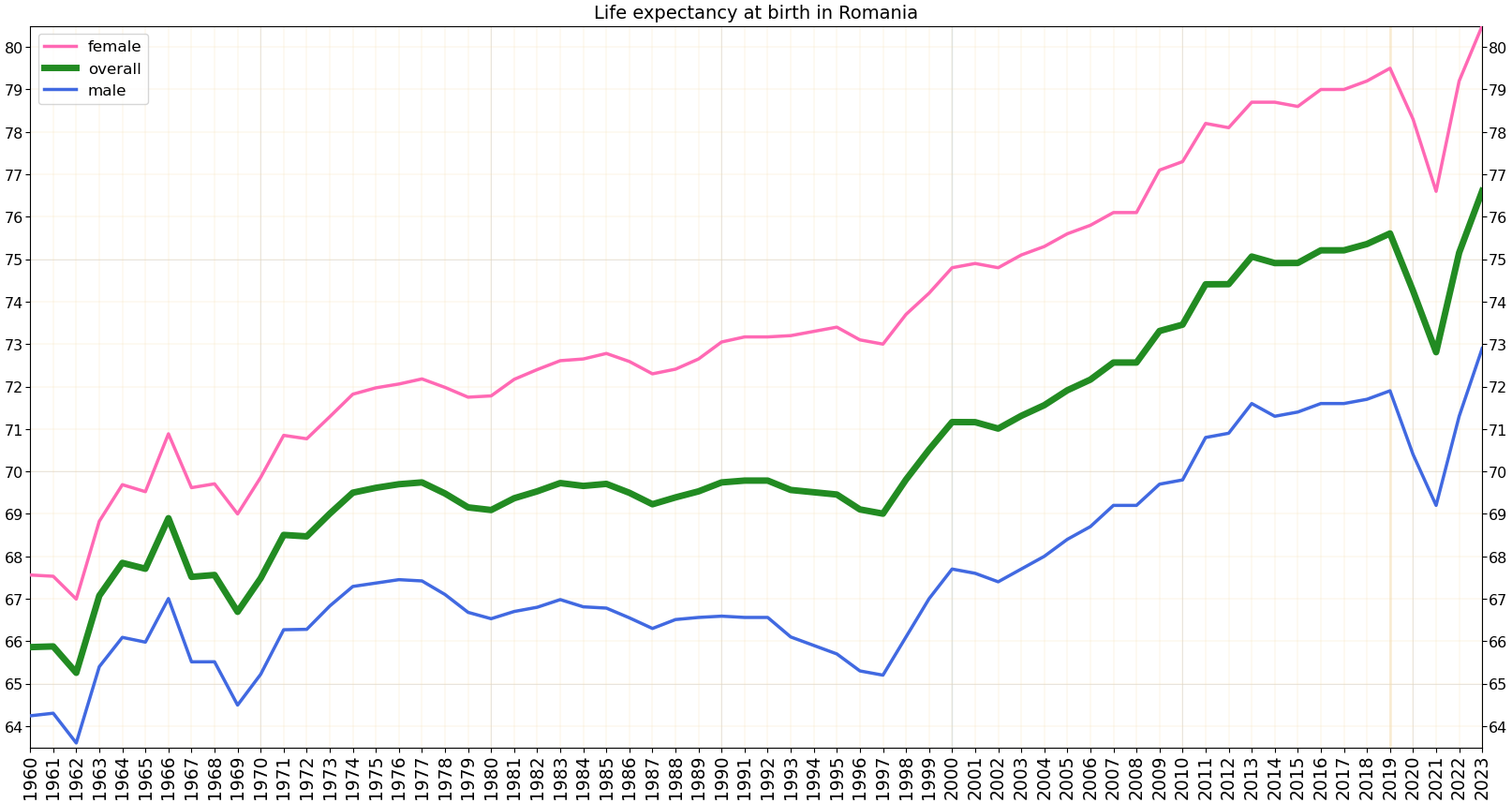
Life expectancy at birth in Romania

Health in Romania is a level that concerns health status where it is affected by factors including universal healthcare, risk factors and culture.

== Introduction ==
The World Bank shows that Romania's economy is getting better and aligning with the European Union, but it's not benefiting everyone equally and isn't environmentally sustainable. Problems include uneven development across regions, weak government systems, lack of qualified workers, a shrinking workforce, and risks from natural disasters and climate change. Spending habits have created financial and trade imbalances. The big challenge now is to fix these financial issues while also making sure everyone in society benefits. Romania's economy grew very slowly in 2024, which has slowed down efforts to reduce poverty. This is due to a lack of private investment and a growing trade deficit. It's expected that global economic uncertainty will continue to negatively impact Romania's growth and poverty reduction in 2025 and beyond. High debt and trade imbalances will likely continue to be a problem.

== Right to Healthcare ==
According to Article 34 of the Constitution of Romania: Everyone has the right to healthcare. The government must ensure good hygiene and public health standards. How medical care and social support are set up for when people are sick, injured, pregnant, or need rehabilitation, along with how medical jobs are regulated and other ways to protect people's health, both physical and mental, will all be defined by law.

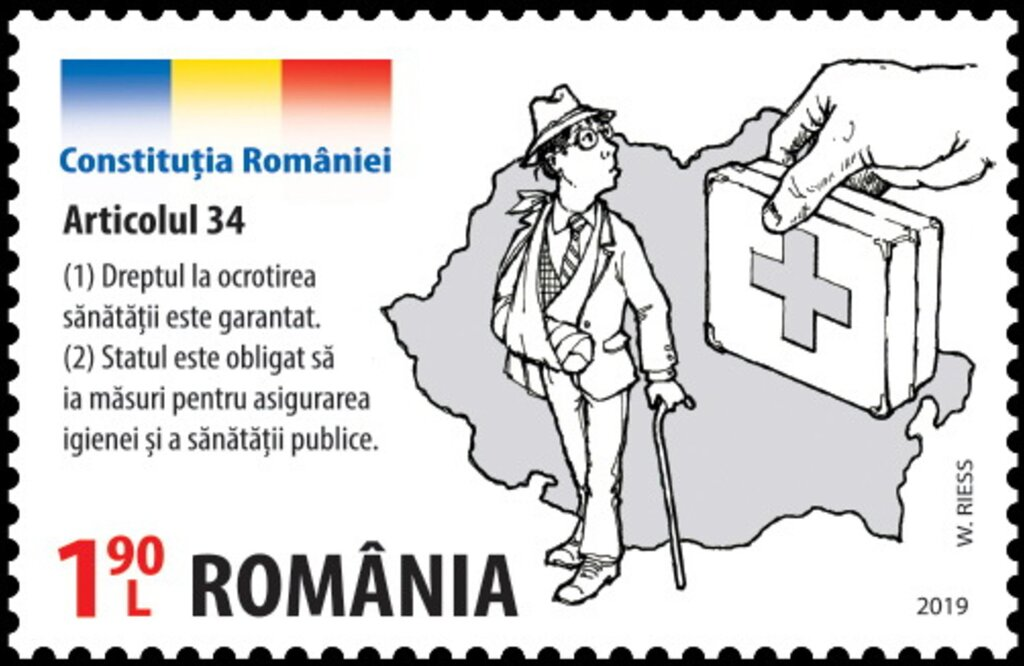
Right to Health Care in Article 34, the Constitution of Romania

== State of Health ==
In Romania, the average life expectancy dropped significantly between 2019 and 2021 because of COVID-19, but it started to recover by 2022. COVID-19 was a major cause of preventable deaths, and not many people are vaccinated. Despite this, most Romanians feel their health is good, which is better than the average in the EU. This positive view is consistent across different genders and income levels. Romania can greatly improve public health by tackling lifestyle and environmental risks. Despite low obesity, poor diet, smoking, and drinking significantly contribute to mortality. Men's lower life expectancy is largely due to higher rates of smoking and heavy drinking compared to women.

Romania faces healthcare access issues, with nearly 5% unable to get needed care due to cost and availability. This is worsened by high out-of-pocket expenses and a shortage of healthcare workers, many of whom leave the country. The system is hospital-centric, sidelining primary care and contributing to high mortality rates. Despite comprehensive health insurance, a significant portion of the population remains uninsured, especially vulnerable groups such as the Romani minority. Overall health spending per person is the lowest in the EU.

Romania is using a large share of funds made available through the EU’s Recovery and Resilience Plan as well as EU Cohesion Policy to upgrade its hospitals, improve patient safety and reduce infections. They also plan to invest more in digital healthcare to make the system more accessible, effective, and resilient.

Mental illness and unmet mental healthcare needs appear low in Romania compared to EU levels, but this may be due to stigma hiding the real need. Mental healthcare is mainly hospital-based, but there are plans to expand community services and improve access.

== UN SDG 3 Good Health AND Well-Being ==
Romania ranked 37th globally for its SDG 3 (Good Health and Well-being) progress, with a score of 77.67 according to the SDG Transformation Center's 2025 report. The overall ranking improved slightly between 2021 and 2025, but its performance in specific areas, including health indicators, can be mixed, with some European reports indicating that Romania lags behind other EU member states in achieving the SDGs overall.

== Diseases ==
The main causes of death in 2004 in Romania were cardiovascular disease (62%), followed by malignant tumors (17%), digestive diseases (6%), accidents, injuries and poisoning (5%), and respiratory diseases (5%). Deaths from external causes and from infectious and parasitic diseases are more common in Romania (4–5%) than in other EU member states. It is estimated that a fifth of the total population of Romania suffers from a communicable or chronic disease.

There were 17,283 people with tuberculosis in 2008. The mortality rate is 31.8 people per 1,000 infected citizens. Some statistics show that 30,000 people have been infected with tuberculosis, making it the third-highest rate among countries in Eastern Europe.

Approximately 3.7% of the total population of Romania is either a carrier or affected by hepatitis.

Less than 1% of the total population of Romania is a carrier or infected with HIV. The most common cause of getting HIV is sharing needles. The first case of AIDS in Romania was diagnosed in 1985, and in 1989 cases have been reported in children. Between 1985 and 2014 were reported 19,906 cases, 6,540 deaths, respectively (468 new cases per year).

Romania had the fifth-highest mortality in Europe, at 691 per 100,000 population, and the fourth-highest death rate from communicable diseases in 2015.

In 2021, the top causes of death per 100,000 people in Romania were Ischemic heart disease, COVID-19, Stroke, Lower respiratory infections, Hypertensive heart disease, Trachea, bronchus, and lung cancers, Cirrhosis of the liver, Colon and rectum cancers, Chronic obstructive pulmonary disease, and Kidney diseases.

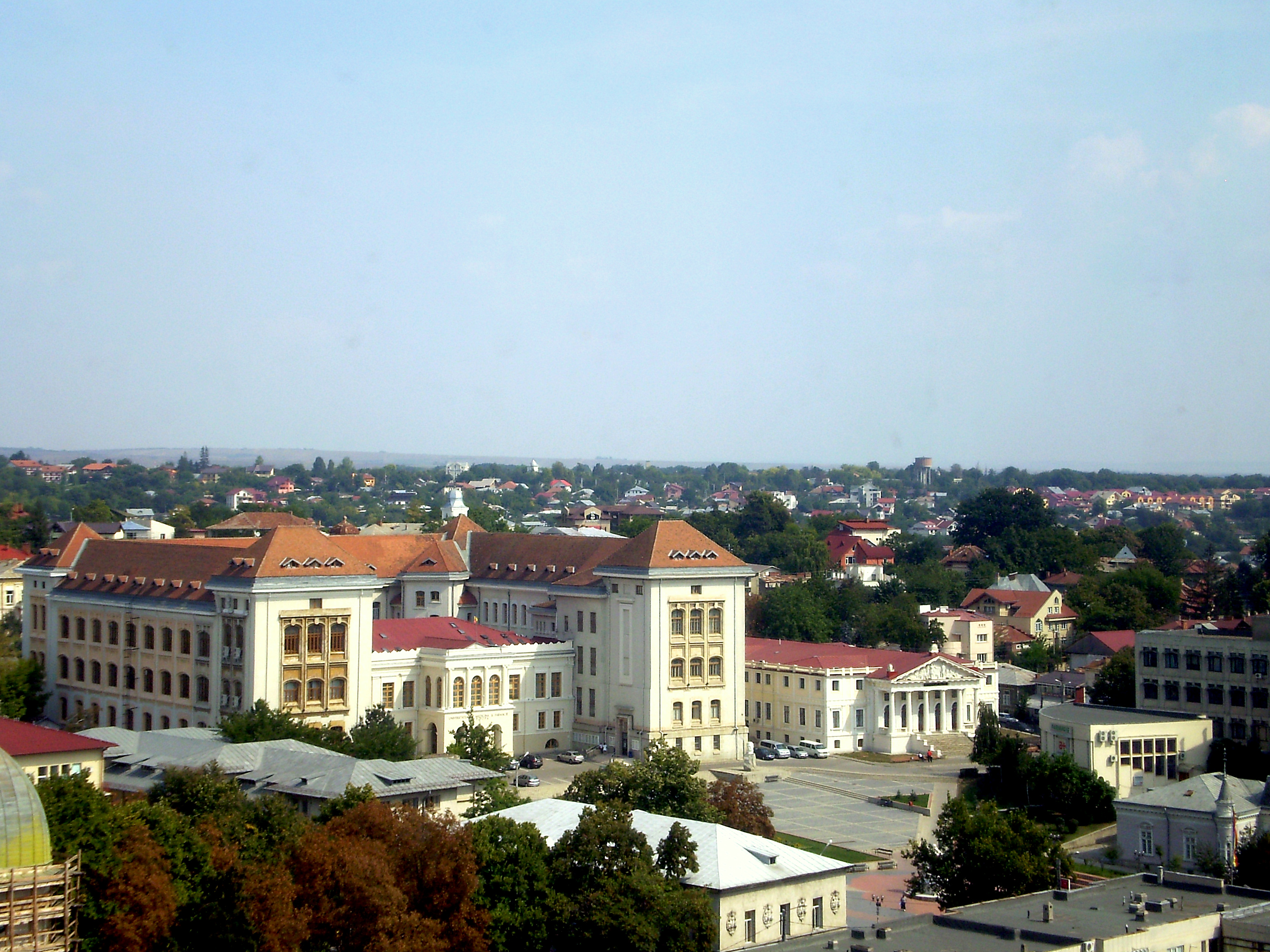
Grigore T. Popa University of Medicine, Iaşi

=== Mental Health ===
The two most frequently diagnosed mental health conditions are anxiety and depressive disorders. During the COVID-19 pandemic, Romanians living in households that reported financial difficulties were at double the risk of depression compared to those who did not report such difficulties.

The Estuar Foundation, alongside Mental Health Europe have established an interactive platform that identifies free mental health support service across Romania.

=== WHO Country Office, Romania ===
The World Health Organization Country Office in Romania, established in 1991, supports the Ministry of Health and the Romanian Government in developing health policy and improving the health of the population. The office focuses on priorities set out in a collaborative agreement between WHO/Europe and Romania, working with national institutions and international partner agencies.

== Potential future impact of climate change on health ==
The World Bank has a Climate Change Knowledge Portal that presents Romania's projected climate. Examples of impact of climate change are : surface air temperature anomalies, precipitation

== See also ==
- Healthcare in Romania
- COVID-19 pandemic in Romania
- Health in Romania, Romanian page
- European Investment Bank Report on climate change impact
