= Ilir Hasani =

Albanian traumatologist, Deputy Minister of Health of Northern Macedonia

Former Deputy Minister of Health of North Macedonia
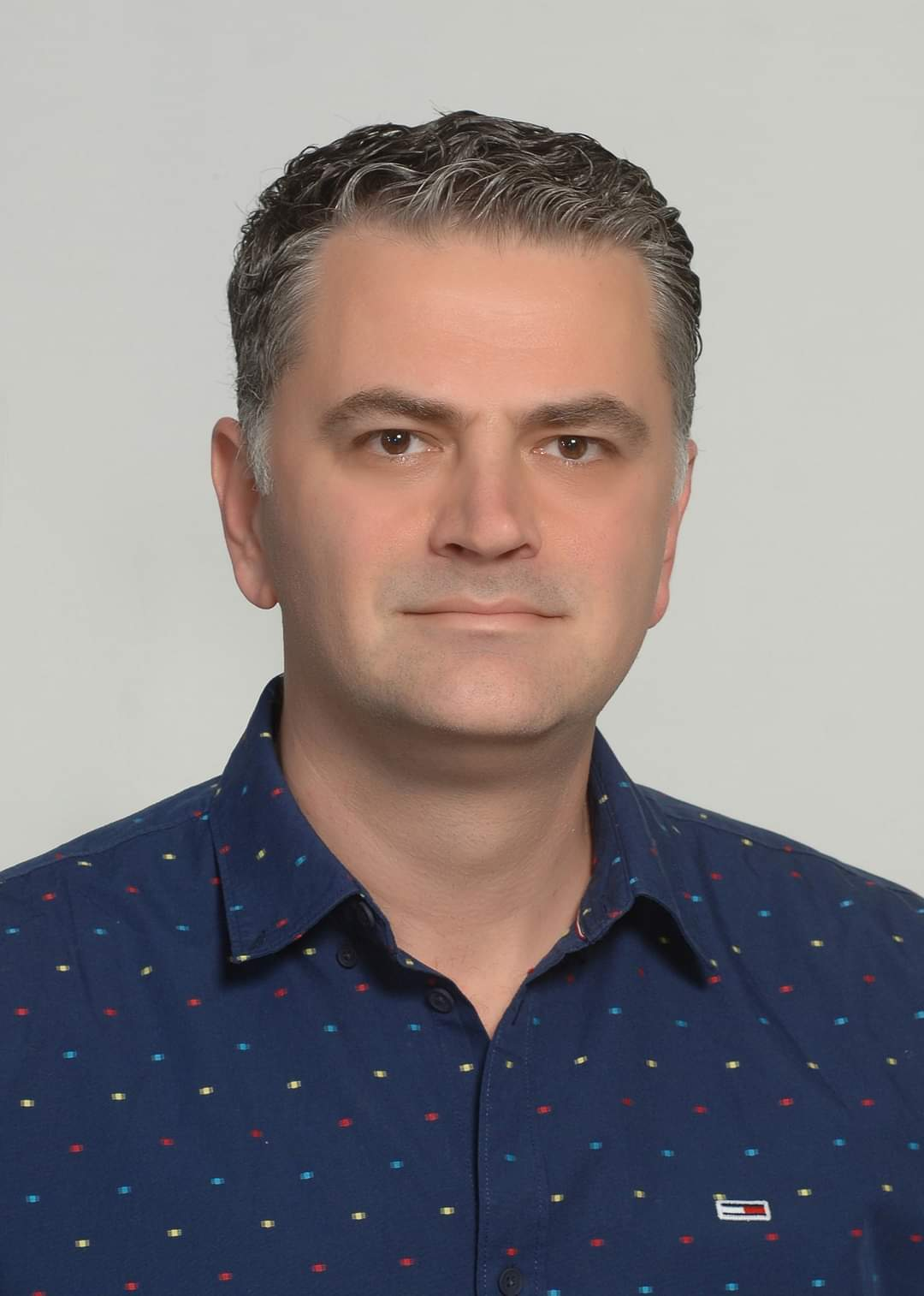
- Incumbent; Ilir Hasani since 24 September 2020-2024
- Ministry of Health
- Website: https://vlada.mk/node/23371

Ilir Hasani is a politician, surgeon, member of parliament and former Deputy Minister of Health of North Macedonia.

== Early life and education ==
He was born in Kumanovo, on May 23, 1977, to a family of Albanian doctors and scholars. He finished elementary education in Kumanovo and secondary education both in Kumanovo and Preshevo, and went on to the University of Ss. Cyril and Methodius in Skopje, graduating in 2001. He was first employed in Private Healthcare Institution "Zana". In 2003, he started volunteering at the Clinic of Traumatology in Skopje, where he was hired in 2004 and where he earned a permanent job as a surgeon in 2008.

In March 2018, he completed his doctoral studies in the field of traumatology at the Faculty of Medicine at the University of Ss. Cyril and Methodius in Skopje.

In 2018 he completed his subspecialty in the field of traumatology of the musculoskeletal system.

== Career ==
In 2006, he was promoted to young assistant in surgery, in 2011 promoted further to assistant. In 2015 he was elected assistant doctoral student at the Faculty of Medicine in the subject of surgery. From 2009 to 2010 he held the position of director of the Clinic for Orthopedic Diseases at the Clinical Center-Skopje. In 2009, he was elected national representative of the NATO Forces Medical Association Committee.

In June 2010 he was appointed Deputy Coordinator of Surgical Clinics with the Emergency Center, the Clinic for Anesthesia, Resuscitation and Intensive Care and the Clinic of Orthopedic Diseases.

From 2011 to 2017 he was the director of the Emergency Surgical Center, where he made a major contribution to the organization of emergency services, emergency diagnostics, emergency care of patients with acute surgical diseases in normal conditions and in conditions of mass casualties.

Since August 2017, by the decision of the Government of the Republic of North Macedonia, he was appointed Director of the IPH KU of Traumatology, Orthopedic Diseases, Anesthesia, Resuscitation and Intensive Care, Emergency Center in Skopje. In 2017 he was appointed National Advisor to the Minister of Health.

He has participated in many congresses, symposia and other professional and scientific meetings of international and national character as a guest lecturer and is the author and co-author of many publications and scientific papers that have been reviewed in journals, congresses and symposia.

He is fluent in English, for which he has an internationally recognized certificate from the University of Cambridge, and has a basic knowledge of the German language.

He is a member of the Macedonian Medical Association, a member of the Macedonian Association of Orthopedists and Traumatologists, a member of the AO Alumni Association, a member of the AO Spine Association, a member of the Macedonian Red Cross and chair of the trauma committee of SICOT.
