= Virar hospital fire =

2021 hospital fire in Virar, India

- Date: 23 April 2021
- Location: Virar, Maharashtra, India
- Type: building fire
- Deaths: 13
- Injuries: unknown

On 23 April 2021, a fire in a hospital in the coastal city of Virar, in Maharashtra, India, killed at least 13 COVID-19 patients.

== Background ==
India was badly affected by the COVID-19 pandemic. Overcrowding and a shortage of oxygen were among the frequent problems caused. On 21 April 2021, 24 COVID patients in a hospital in Nashik, Maharashtra, died after the oxygen supply to their ventilators was interrupted. In 2021, fatal fires at hospitals in India also occurred in Mumbai and Bharuch.

== Incident ==
In the early hours of 23 April 2021, a fire broke out in the intensive care unit of Vijay Vallabh hospital in Virar, a city which is to the north of Mumbai in the Indian state Maharashtra. There were 17 patients in the ward at the time, 13 of whom were killed.
