= Pharmaceutical industry in Romania =

The pharmaceutical industry in Romania is prosperous, with an average revenue of 8.3 billion lei per year. Value chain in the pharmaceutical industry has increased significantly in the last decade in all segments, contributing with over 1% to GDP (2010). There are 22 plants of productions which receive subsidies from the state. The largest Romanian drugmaker is Terapia S.A., based in Cluj-Napoca. The biggest player in distribution of drugs, depending on turnover, is Mediplus. The company is part of A&D Pharma group, founded in 1994, which also controls the network of pharmacies Sensiblu. The logistics network of Mediplus consists of 10 regional warehouses and a national logistics center.

== Regulation ==
The National Agency for Medicines and Medical Devices regulates the medicine and medical devices market. It supervises the manufacture, import and distribution of human-use medicines, investigates complaints about medicines and authorises and verifies clinical trials. Ministry of Health Order 194/2015 regulates the advertising of medicinal products. It prohibits gifts of more than €35 to clinicians.
