= Nasiriyah District =

Nasiriyah District Arabic: قضاء الناصرية
- District
- Location within Iraq
- Country: Iraq
- Governorates: Dhi Qar Governorate
- Time zone: UTC+3 (AST)

Nasiriyah District (Arabic: قضاء الناصرية) is a district of the Dhi Qar Governorate in Iraq.
