= Elisabeta Moldovan =

Romanian activist

- Born: Romania
- Occupation: Disability activist

Elisabeta Moldovan is a Romanian activist known as a representative for the movement for the deinstitutionalization of people with intellectual disability. She is the president of the Ceva de Spus Association of Romania, an association linked to the movement for self-representatives who promote deinstitutionalization processes and promotion of community-based services. Moldovan also is a member of the Board of Directors of Inclusion Europe and belongs to the group that organizes every congress of the European Platform of Self-Advocates (EPSA).

Moldovan promotes a platform of supporting people with disabilities so that they can form a part of society and live outside of institutions. She bases her ideas on her own lived experience of spending 23 years in institutions with conditions that she describes as inhumane. Her experience has inspired the creation of a graphic novel about life in these institutions. The book, written and illustrated by Dan Ungureanu based on interviews with Moldovan, is available in Romanian and English. The English title is "Becoming Eli."

She has spoken at international events including the EPSA Congress in Madrid in 2015, the Conference of Admirable Practices's Inclusion Plenary in 2016 in Córdoba, and the EPSA Congress in Brussels in 2017.
