= European Union Statistics on Income and Living Conditions =

The European Union Statistics on Income and Living Conditions, (also known as European Union Survey on Income and Living Conditions) abbreviated EU-SILC, is a survey department of the EU. In 2004, it replaced the European Community Household Panel (ECHP), which covered the years 1994–2003. The EU-SILC includes only minor changes relative to its predecessor the ECHP; most importantly, it significantly expands the number of countries included in the sample.
