= Gaziantep hospital fire =

Fatal fire in Turkey in 2020

On 19 December 2020, a fire at occurred at privately run Sanko University Hospital in Gaziantep, Turkey. It killed 13 people. The fire broke out in the intensive care unit which was treating COVID-19 patients. It started at 4:45 am, caused by an oxygen cylinder exploding on the ward, while 19 patients were present. Hospital staff and firefights broke the windows of the intensive care unit, which allowed them to remove all the patients in the ward. Seven people died on the spot and six died while being transferred to another hospital. Fourteen people – eleven from the intensive care ward and three from other parts of the hospital – were transferred to other hospitals in the city to be treated for smoke inhalation.

== See also ==
- Piatra Neamț hospital fire
