= Matei Balș hospital fire =

2021 fire in Bucharest, Romania

- Date: 29 January 2021
- Time: ~05:00 (EET)
- Venue: Prof. Dr. Matei Balș National Institute for Infectious Diseases
- Location: Bucharest, Romania; 44°27′21.5″N 26°06′49.1″E
- Type: Fire
- Deaths: 17

On 29 January 2021, at around 05:00 EET, a fire broke out at the COVID-19 facility in the Prof. Dr. Matei Balș National Institute for Infectious Diseases in Bucharest, Romania, killing five people. On 4 February 2021, the death toll on the fire was reported to have risen to 12. The death toll rose again to 14 on 6 February 2021, with one more death added to the death toll on 8 February 2021 and two more again on 9 February 2021.

== See also ==
- COVID-19 pandemic in Romania
- List of building or structure fires
- Piatra Neamț hospital fire
- Constanța hospital fire
