= Piatra Neamț hospital fire =

2020 fire in Piatra Neamț, Romania

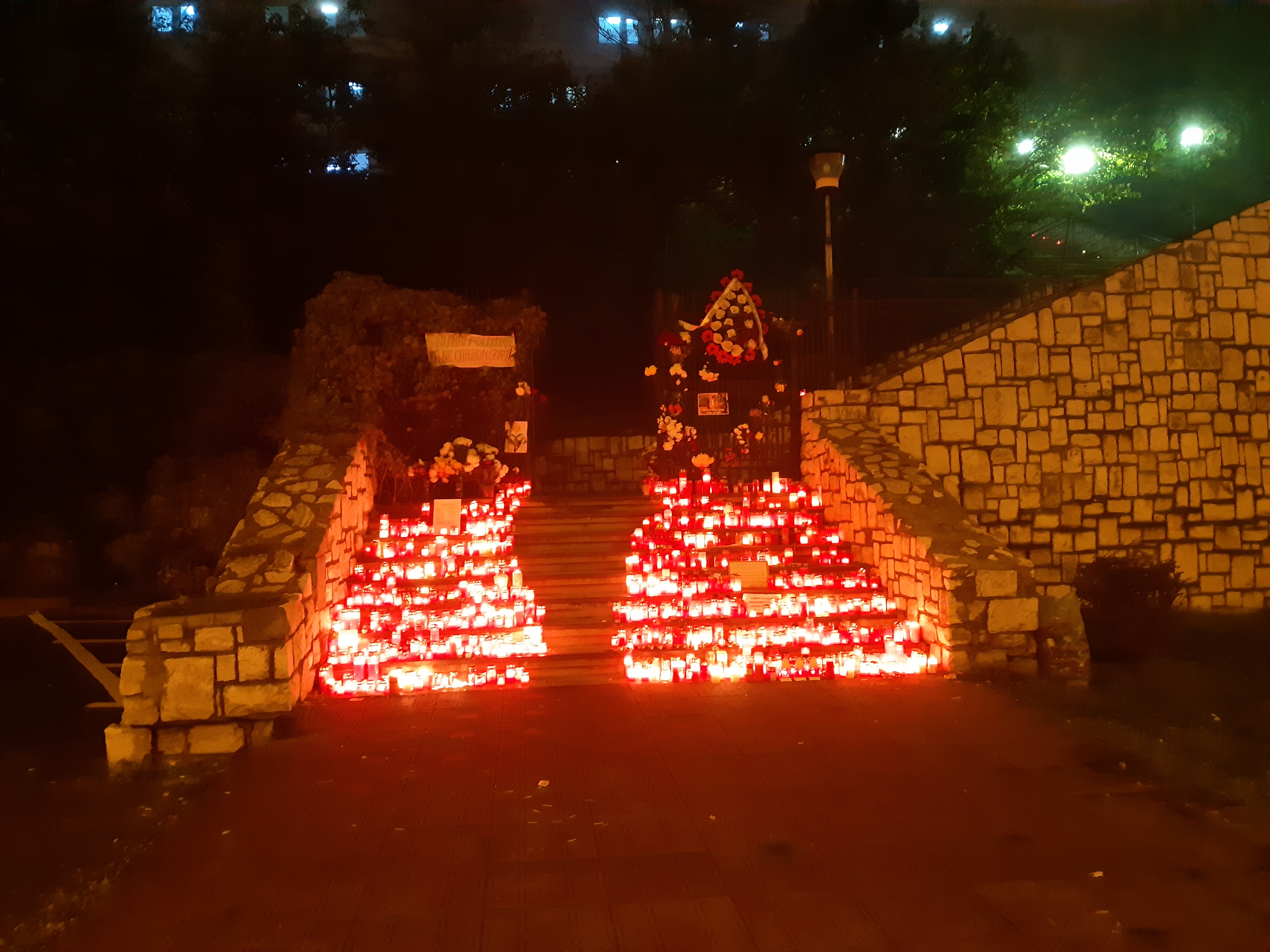
- Makeshift memorial for the victims of the fire
- Date: 14 November 2020
- Time: ~18:30 (EET)
- Duration: 25 minutes
- Venue: Piatra Neamț Emergency Hospital
- Location: Piatra Neamț, Neamț County, Romania; 46°55′43.5″N 26°22′26.1″E
- Type: Fire
- Cause: Short circuit to a syringe pump (under investigation)
- Deaths: 10
- Injuries: 4

On 14 November 2020, around 18:30 EET, a fire broke out in the COVID-19 ward of the Piatra Neamț Emergency Hospital in Piatra Neamț, Romania. The fire killed ten people and injured another four, including two doctors. All the deceased people were patients receiving treatment for COVID-19. Many in the ward were on ventilators. The fire brought back to the public's attention the state of the Romanian health system, as well as the political interference in hospital management.

The hospital fire at Piatra Neamț was followed by other deadly ones, more precisely at Bucharest in January 2021 and at Constanța in October 2021.

== Fire ==
The fire broke out on the second floor of Piatra Neamț Emergency Hospital, where the COVID-19 ward was located. Initially, the medical staff intervened, trying to extinguish the fire and help the patients. Firefighters responded with five fire trucks and a ladder. According to them, the fire had a "very, very fast evolution". Sources in the investigation said the fire broke out from a syringe pump and quickly spread to the oxygen source. A strong deflagration followed, and the fire spread to the room. The fire was extinguished in about 25 minutes. Nelu Tătaru, the Minister of Health, declared that during the fire eight ICU beds were completely burned.

== Victims ==
Ten people were killed in the fire, three women and seven men. All were patients with COVID-19 and were between 67 and 86 years old. Eight of the victims were killed in the room where the fire broke out, and two others died of respiratory failure while being evacuated from the adjoining room. A doctor on ward round who tried to save the patients from the flames was critically injured after his protective equipment caught fire. He suffered burns on 40% of his body surface and fourth-degree burns on his limbs. He was brought to Bucharest during the night of 14–15 November and was prepared at the Floreasca Emergency Hospital to be transported by military aircraft to Queen Astrid Military Hospital in Brussels. Three more medical staff – a doctor and two nurses – received burn care, but their condition was good and they did not need hospitalization. Six patients from the adjoining room were transferred to the modular hospital in Lețcani, Iași County, for proper treatment. Three of them were in serious condition, but none suffered burns.

== Investigation ==
The Prosecutor's Office attached to the Neamț Tribunal opened an in rem case for culpable homicide. Subsequently, the investigation was taken over by the General Prosecutor's Office. The investigation was led by Marius Iacob, a prosecutor who in the past dealt with the investigations into the Colectiv nightclub fire and the Giulești Maternity Hospital fire.

Dan Iamandi, the head of the General Inspectorate for Emergency Situations, ordered the creation of two commissions regarding the Piatra Neamț fire: one of the commissions will determine the probable cause of the fire, and the second will verify the observance of the authorization conditions. The hospital obtained a fire safety permit before 1990. Marius Filip, director of the Standards Unit within the National Authority for Quality Management in Health, stated in a telephone interview with Digi24 that the Piatra Neamț Emergency Hospital had irregularities in terms of staff and patient safety.

According to George Lazăr, the prefect of Neamț County, the ICU for patients with COVID-19 was moved from the third floor to the second floor of the building on 14 November, a few hours before the fire broke out, without approval and without notifying the authorities. His claims were contradicted by the hospital manager, according to which the Public Health Directorate had given its approval for the operation of the ICU on the second floor of the medical unit. However, on the evening of 15 November, the Neamț Public Health Directorate issued a statement in which it showed that the reconfiguration of the ICU and the relocation of COVID-19-positive patients, from the third floor to the second floor, was carried out without approval.

== Reactions ==
President Klaus Iohannis sent a condolence message to the families and prayed for the victims at the Jesuit Church in Sibiu. He also stressed the need to reform the public health system. Prime Minister Ludovic Orban said he was shocked by the tragedy and promised the identification and the prosecution of the guilty ones.

The Minister of Health, Nelu Tătaru, made an emergency visit to Piatra Neamț to assess the situation at the County Hospital. He announced that the hospitals subordinated to the local authorities will be placed under the coordination of the Ministry of Health. Tătaru also stated that there is a collective guilt for the Piatra Neamț fire and that an urgent reevaluation of the entire Romanian medical system is needed.

After a working meeting at the Victoria Palace, Orban announced that, starting with 16 November, joint teams of the Public Health Directorates and the General Inspectorate for Emergency Situations will carry out controls in all ICUs at national level to check the installations and the conditions for the commissioning of medical equipment.

Mara Togănel, the prefect of Mureș County, announced that the health units in Mureș County will come to support the Piatra Neamț Emergency Hospital with ICU beds, ventilators, monitors and syringe pumps.

The gate of the hospital near to the surgical pavilion that includes the ICU department, on the third day after the fire

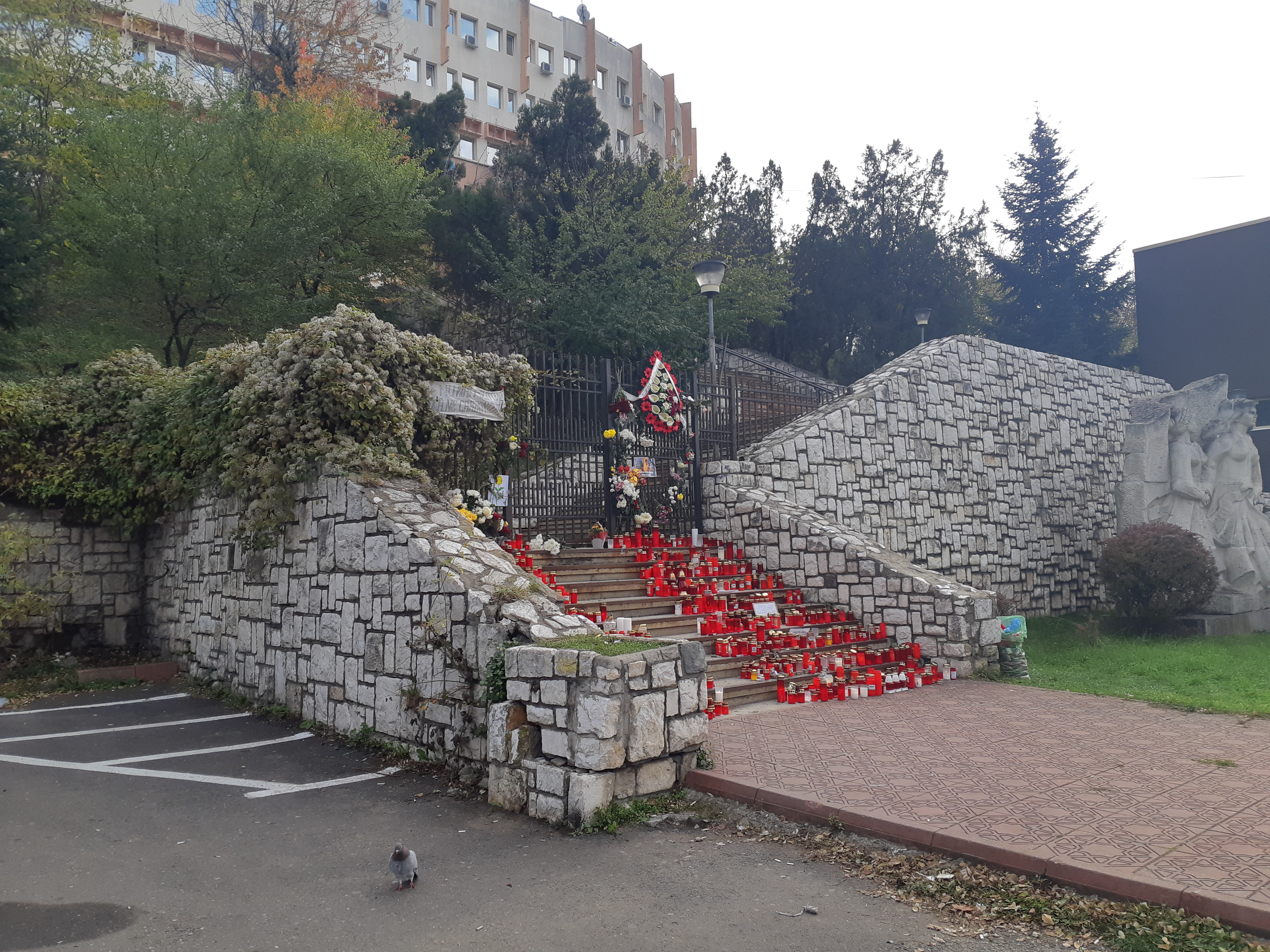

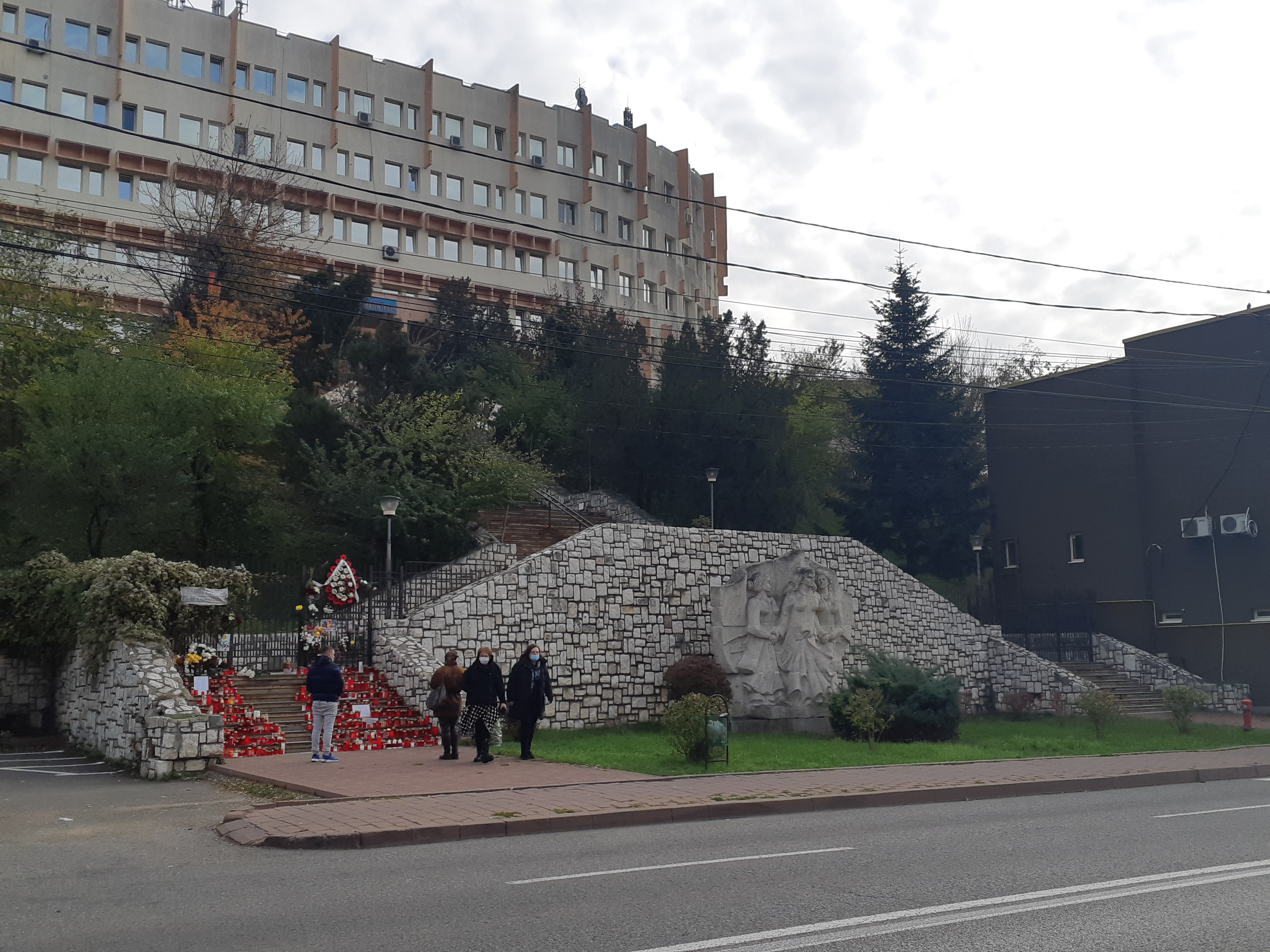

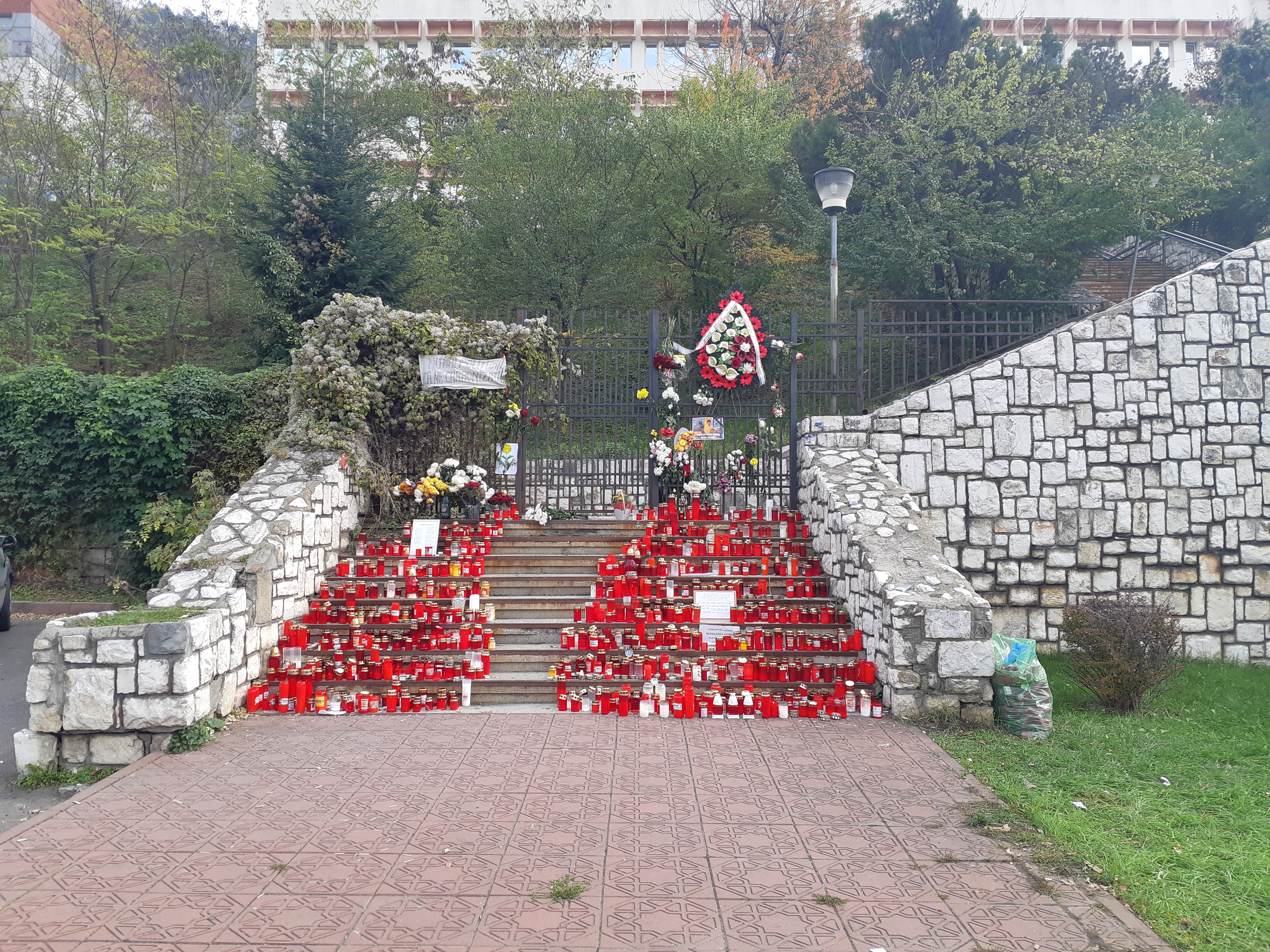

=== Political ===
The Social Democratic Party and the Save Romania Union announced the suspension of any election campaign action for their parties out of respect for the victims of the fire. The National Liberal Party postponed the governing program launch event, scheduled for 16 November.

=== International ===
At the end of the Angelus, Pope Francis sent a message of compassion and prayed for the victims of the Piatra Neamț fire. Condolence messages were also conveyed by politicians from Austria, France, Hungary, Israel, Kosovo, North Macedonia and Turkey. The mayor of Chișinău, Ion Ceban, laid a wreath at the Romanian Embassy in Moldova as a tribute to the victims of the fire.

== See also ==
- COVID-19 pandemic in Romania
- List of building or structure fires
- Matei Balș hospital fire
- Constanța hospital fire
