= List of statutory instruments of the United Kingdom, 1998 =

This is an incomplete list of statutory instruments of the United Kingdom in 1998.

== 1–100 ==
- The Road Vehicles (Construction and Use) (Amendment) Regulations 1998 (S.I. 1998 No. 1)
- The National Health Service (Proposals for Pilot Schemes) and (Miscellaneous Amendments) Amendment Regulations 1998 (S.I. 1998 No. 3)
- The National Health Service (General Medical Services) (Scotland) Amendment Regulations 1998 (S.I. 1998 No.4 (S.1)])
- The National Health Service (Vocational Training for General Medical Practice) (Scotland) Regulations 1998 (S.I. 1998 No. 5 (S.2)])
- The River Tweed (Baits and Lures) Regulations 1998 (S.I. 1998 No. 6 (S.3)])
- The A205 Trunk Road (Greenwich) Red Route (Banned Turns) Traffic Order 1998 (S.I. 1998 No. 8)
- The Beef Carcase (Classification) (Amendment) Regulations 1998 (S.I. 1998 No. 12)
- The A501 Trunk Road (Euston Road, Camden) Red Route (Prescribed Routes) Traffic Order 1998 (S.I. 1998 No. 15)
- The Chester to Holyhead Trunk Road (A55) (Bryngwran to Holyhead) Order 1998 (S.I. 1998 No. 16)
- The Social Fund Winter Fuel Payment Regulations 1998 (S.I. 1998 No. 19)
- The Motor Vehicles (Driving Licences) (Amendment) Regulations 1998 (S.I. 1998 No. 20)
- The Lands Tribunal (Amendment) Rules 1998 (S.I. 1998 No. 22)
- The Prison (Amendment) Rules 1998 (S.I. 1998 No. 23)
- The A1400 Trunk Road (Redbridge) Red Route (Prohibited Turn) Traffic Order 1998 (S.I. 1998 No. 24)
- The A23 Trunk Road (Croydon) Red Route (Prohibited Turns) Traffic Order 1998 (S.I. 1998 No. 25)
- The A12 Trunk Road (Redbridge) (No. 1) Red Route Traffic Order 1996 Variation Order 1998 (S.I. 1998 No. 26)
- The Financial Markets and Insolvency (Ecu Contracts) Regulations 1998 (S.I. 1998 No. 27)
- The A12 Trunk Road (Redbridge) Red Route Traffic Order 1996 Variation (No. 2) Order 1998 (S.I. 1998 No. 29)
- The A1400 Trunk Road (Redbridge) Red Route Traffic Order 1996 Variation Order 1998 (S.I. 1998 No. 30)
- The Employment Protection Code of Practice (Disciplinary Practice and Procedures) Order 1998 (S.I. 1998 No. 44)
- The Employment Protection Code of Practice (Disclosure of Information) Order 1998 (S.I. 1998 No. 45)
- The Employment Protection Code of Practice (Time Off) Order 1998 (S.I. 1998 No. 46)
- The Council Tax and Non-Domestic Rating (Demand Notices) (England) (Amendment) (Rural Rate Relief) Regulations 1998 (S.I. 1998 No. 47)
- The Local Government Changes (Rent Act Registration Areas) Order 1998 (S.I. 1998 No. 54)
- The Immigration (Transit Visa) (Amendment) Order 1998 (S.I. 1998 No. 55)
- The A1 Trunk Road (Haringey) Red Route Traffic Order 1993 Variation (No. 2) Order 1998 (S.I. 1998 No. 56)
- The A10 Trunk Road (Haringey) Red Route Traffic Order 1997 Variation Order 1998 (S.I. 1998 No. 57)
- The Child Support (Miscellaneous Amendments) Regulations 1998 (S.I. 1998 No. 58)
- The Value Added Tax (Amendment) Regulations 1998 (S.I. 1998 No. 59)
- The Insurance Premium Tax (Amendment) Regulations 1998 (S.I. 1998 No. 60)
- The Landfill Tax (Amendment) Regulations 1998 (S.I. 1998 No. 61)
- The Revenue Traders (Accounts and Records) (Amendment) Regulations 1998 (S.I. 1998 No. 62)
- The Aircraft Operators (Accounts and Records) (Amendment) Regulations 1998 (S.I. 1998 No. 63)
- The Jobseeker's Allowance (Amendment) Regulations 1998 (S.I. 1998 No. 71)
- The Food Protection (Emergency Prohibitions) (Radioactivity in Sheep) (Wales) (Partial Revocation) Order 1998 (S.I. 1998 No. 72)
- The General Optical Council (Registration and Enrolment (Amendment) Rules) Order of Council 1998 (S.I. 1998 No. 73)
- The A41 Trunk Road (Westminster) Red Route Traffic Order 1998 (S.I. 1998 No. 76)
- The A1 Trunk Road (Islington) Red Route Traffic Order 1993 Experimental Variation Order 1998 (S.I. 1998 No. 77)
- The A501 Trunk Road (Camden and Westminster) Red Route Traffic Order 1998 (S.I. 1998 No. 78)
- The Nitrate Sensitive Areas (Amendment) Regulations 1998 (S.I. 1998 No. 79)
- The Education (Grants for Education Support and Training) (England) (Amendment) Regulations 1998 (S.I. 1998 No. 80)
- The Electrical Equipment for Explosive Atmospheres (Certification) (Amendment) Regulations 1998 (S.I. 1998 No. 81)
- The Food Protection (Emergency Prohibitions) (Radioactivity in Sheep) Partial Revocation Order 1998 (S.I. 1998 No. 82 (S.4)])
- The London Docklands Development Corporation (Transfer of Property, Rights and Liabilities) Order 1998 (S.I. 1998 No. 83)
- The Urban Development Corporations in England (Planning Functions) Order 1998 (S.I. 1998 No. 84)
- The Urban Development Corporations in England (Transfer of Property, Rights and Liabilities) (Commission for the New Towns) Order 1998 (S.I. 1998 No. 85)
- The Education (Direct Grant Schools) (Revocation) Regulations 1998 (S.I. 1998 No. 86)
- The Rating Lists (Valuation Date) Order 1998 (S.I. 1998 No. 93)

== 101–200 ==
- The Feeding Stuffs (Amendment) Regulations 1998 (S.I. 1998 No. 104)
- The Council Tax (Prescribed Classes of Dwellings) (Wales) Regulations 1998 (S.I. 1998 No. 105)
- The Approval of Codes of Management Practice(Residential Property) Order 1998 (S.I. 1998 No. 106)
- The Medicines (Pharmacy and General Sale—Exemption) Amendment Order 1998 (S.I. 1998 No. 107)
- The Prescription Only Medicines (Human Use) Amendment Order 1998 (S.I. 1998 No. 108)
- The National Crime Squad (Secretary of State's Objectives) Order 1998 (S.I. 1998 No. 109)
- The NCIS (Secretary of State's Objectives) Order 1998 (S.I. 1998 No. 110)
- The Temporary Traffic Signs (Prescribed Bodies) (England and Wales) Regulations 1998 (S.I. 1998 No. 111)
- The Haverfordwest to Milford Haven Trunk Road (A4076) (Victoria Bridge, Milford Haven Improvement) Order 1998 (S.I. 1998 No. 112)
- The Deregulation (Licence Transfers) Order 1998 (S.I. 1998 No. 114)
- The Licensing (Fees) (Amendment) Order 1998 (S.I. 1998 No. 115)
- The Recreational Craft (Amendment) Regulations 1998 (S.I. 1998 No. 116)
- The London Borough of Lambeth (Trunk Roads) Red Route (Bus Lanes) Traffic Order 1998 (S.I. 1998 No. 118)
- The Local Government Finance (New Parishes) Regulations 1998 (S.I. 1998 No. 119)
- The Local Government Act 1988 (Defined Activities) (Exemption) (Harlow District Council) Order 1998 (S.I. 1998 No. 120)
- The Birmingham Northern Relief Road and Connecting Roads Scheme 1998 (S.I. 1998 No. 121)
- The A5 Trunk Road (Churchbridge Improvement) Order 1998 (S.I. 1998 No. 122)
- The M42 Motorway (Dunton Diversion) Scheme 1998 (S.I. 1998 No. 123)
- The Birmingham Northern Relief Road Toll Order 1998 (S.I. 1998 No. 124)
- The M6 Motorway (Saredon and Packington Diversions) Scheme 1998 (S.I. 1998 No. 125)
- The A5 Trunk Road (Churchbridge Improvement) (Detrunking) Order 1998 (S.I. 1998 No. 126)
- The A5 Trunk Road (Wall Island Improvement) Order 1998 (S.I. 1998 No. 127)
- The A34 Trunk Road (Churchbridge) Order 1998 (S.I. 1998 No. 128)
- The A5148 Trunk Road (Wall Island Improvement) Order 1998 (S.I. 1998 No. 129)
- The A34 Trunk Road (Churchbridge) (Detrunking) Order 1998 (S.I. 1998 No. 130)
- The A5195 Trunk Road (Birmingham Northern Relief Road Link Road) Order 1998 (S.I. 1998 No. 131)
- The Housing Accommodation and Homelessness (Persons subject to Immigration Control) (Amendment) Order 1998 (S.I. 1998 No. 139)
- The Land Registration (District Registries) Order 1998 (S.I. 1998 No. 140)
- The Bread and Flour Regulations 1998 (S.I. 1998 No. 141)
- The Non-Domestic Rating (Demand Notices) (Wales) (Amendment) (Rural Rate Relief) Regulations 1998 (S.I. 1998 No. 155)
- The Hyde-Clarendon College (Dissolution) Order 1998 (S.I. 1998 No. 156)
- The Prevention of Water Pollution (Loch Turret) (Extension of Period of Byelaws) Order 1998 (S.I. 1998 No. 157 (S.5)])
- The Housing Revenue Account General Fund Contribution Limits (Scotland) Order 1998 (S.I. 1998 No. 158 (S. 6)])
- The Non-Domestic Rate (Scotland) Order 1998 (S.I. 1998 No. 159 (S.7)])
- The Knives (Forfeited Property) Regulations (Northern Ireland) 1998 (S.I. 1998 No. 161)
- The Education (Mandatory Awards) (Amendment) Regulations 1998 (S.I. 1998 No. 162)
- The Public Telecommunication System Designation (KDD Europe Limited) Order 1998 (S.I. 1998 No. 163)
- The Public Telecommunication System Designation (The Phone Company) Order 1998 (S.I. 1998 No. 164)
- The Public Telecommunication System Designation (HighwayOne Corporation Limited) Order 1998 (S.I. 1998 No. 165)
- The Public Telecommunication System Designation (Frontel Communications Limited) Order 1998 (S.I. 1998 No. 166)
- The Public Telecommunication System Designation (IDT Global Limited) Order 1998 (S.I. 1998 No. 167)
- The Public Telecommunication System Designation (Teleport (Northern Ireland) Limited) Order 1998 (S.I. 1998 No. 168)
- The Public Telecommunication System Designation (AXS Telecom (UK) Limited) Order 1998 (S.I. 1998 No. 169)
- The Public Telecommunication System Designation (Izenkom Limited) Order 1998 (S.I. 1998 No. 170)
- The Public Telecommunication System Designation (Skylight Holdings Incorporated) Order 1998 (S.I. 1998 No. 171)
- The Public Telecommunication System Designation (Eurobell (Holdings) Plc) Order 1998 (S.I. 1998 No. 172)
- The Public Telecommunication System Designation (GT UK Limited) Order 1998 (S.I. 1998 No. 173)
- The Public Telecommunication System Designation (Internet Network Services Limited) Order 1998 (S.I. 1998 No. 174)
- The Doncaster Royal Infirmary and Montagu Hospital National Health Service Trust (Transfer of Trust Property) Order 1998 (S.I. 1998 No. 175)
- The Isle of Wight Healthcare National Health Service Trust (Transfer of Trust Property) Order 1998 (S.I. 1998 No. 176)
- The Lincoln District Healthcare National Health Service Trust (Transfer of Trust Property) Order 1998 (S.I. 1998 No. 177)
- The North and East Devon Health Authority (Transfers of Trust Property) Order 1998 (S.I. 1998 No. 178)
- The A205 Trunk Road (Southwark) Red Route (Prohibited Turns) Experimental Traffic Order 1998 (S.I. 1998 No. 179)
- The A23 Trunk Road (Lambeth) Red Route (Prohibition of Traffic) Order 1998 (S.I. 1998 No. 180)
- The Broadcasting Act 1996 (Commencement No. 3) Order 1998 (S.I. 1998 No. 188 (C. 1)])
- The Broadcasting (Percentage of National Radio Multiplex Revenue) Order 1998 (S.I. 1998 No. 189)
- The Animals and Animal Products (Import And Export) Regulations 1998 (S.I. 1998 No. 190)
- The Pre-Sentence Report Disclosure (Prescription of Prosecutors) Order 1998 (S.I. 1998 No. 191)
- The Local Government (Discretionary Payments and Injury Benefits) (Scotland) Regulations 1998 (S.I. 1998 No. 192 (S. 8)])
- The Frenchay Healthcare National Health Service Trust (Establishment) Amendment Order 1998 (S.I. 1998 No. 193)

== 201–300 ==
- The Potatoes Originating in Egypt Regulations 1998 (S.I. 1998 No. 201)
- The Excise Duty Point (External and Internal Community Transit Procedure) Regulations 1998 (S.I. 1998 No. 202)
- The Copyright (Certification of Licensing Scheme for Educational Recording of Broadcasts and Cable Programmes) (Educational Recording Agency Limited) (Amendment) Order 1998 (S.I. 1998 No. 203)
- The A3 Trunk Road (Kingston and Wandsworth) (Temporary 30 mph Speed Restriction) Order 1998 (S.I. 1998 No. 204)
- The Civil Aviation (Canadian Navigation Services) (Second Amendment) Regulations 1998 (S.I. 1998 No. 205)
- The Hill Livestock (Compensatory Allowances) (Amendment) Regulations 1998 (S.I. 1998 No. 206)
- The Sole, etc. (Specified Sea Areas) (Prohibition of Fishing) (Variation) Order 1998 (S.I. 1998 No. 207)
- The Education (Funding for Teacher Training) Designation Order 1998 (S.I. 1998 No. 208)
- The Merchant Shipping (Compulsory Insurance: Ships Receiving Trans-shipped Fish) Regulations 1998 (S.I. 1998 No. 209)
- The Education (Student Loans) Act 1998 (Commencement) Order 1998 (S.I. 1998 No. 210 (C.2)])
- The Education (Student Loans) Regulations 1998 (S.I. 1998 No. 211)
- The Building Societies (Transfer of Business) Regulations 1998 (S.I. 1998 No. 212)
- The Local Authorities (Alteration of Requisite Calculations) Regulations 1998 (S.I. 1998 No. 213)
- The Local Government Changes for England (Council Tax) (Transitional Reduction) Regulations 1998 (S.I. 1998 No. 214)
- The Contracting Out (Functions in relation to the Management of Crown Lands) Order 1998 (S.I. 1998 No. 215)
- The Police (Secretary of State's Objectives) Order 1998 (S.I. 1998 No. 216)
- The New Deal (Miscellaneous Provisions) Order 1998 (S.I. 1998 No. 217)
- The Education (Modification of Enactments Relating to Employment) Order 1998 (S.I. 1998 No. 218)
- The Surface Waters (Dangerous Substances) (Classification) (Scotland) Regulations 1998 (S.I. 1998 No. 250 (S.9)])
- The National Health Service (Charges to Overseas Visitors) (Scotland) Amendment Regulations 1998 (S.I. 1998 No. 251 (S.10)])
- The Scottish Legal Services Ombudsman and Commissioner for Local Administration in Scotland Act 1997 (Commencement) Order 1998 (S.I. 1998 No. 252 (C. 3) (S.11)])
- Visiting Forces and International Headquarters (Application of Law) (Amendment) Order 1998 (S.I. 1998 No. 253)
- The Merchant Shipping (Prevention of Pollution) (Amendment) Order 1998 (S.I. 1998 No. 254)
- The Brunei (Appeals) (Amendment) Order 1998 (S.I. 1998 No. 255)
- The Child Abduction and Custody (Parties to Conventions) (Amendment) Order 1998 (S.I. 1998 No. 256)
- The Consular Fees Order 1998 (S.I. 1998 No. 257)
- The Education (Student Loans) (Northern Ireland) Order 1998 (S.I. 1998 No. 258 (N.I. 1)])
- The European Convention on Extradition Order 1990 (Amendment) Order 1998 (S.I. 1998 No. 259)
- The Merchant Shipping (Oil Pollution and General Provisions) (Guernsey) Order 1998 (S.I. 1998 No. 260)
- Museums and Galleries (Northern Ireland) Order 1997 (S.I. 1998 No. 261 (N.I. 2)])
- The Naval, Military and Air Forces Etc. (Disablement and Death) Service Pensions Amendment Order 1998 (S.I. 1998 No. 262)
- The Social Security (Contributions and Industrial Injuries) (Canada) Order 1998 (S.I. 1998 No. 263)
- The Trial of the Pyx (Amendment) Order 1998 (S.I. 1998 No. 264)
- The Housing (Change of Landlord) (Payment of Disposal Cost by Instalments) (Amendment) Regulations 1998 (S.I. 1998 No. 265)
- The Council Tax Reduction Scheme (Wales) Regulations 1998 (S.I. 1998 No. 266)
- The Council Tax (Demand Notices) (Wales) (Transitional Provisions) Regulations 1998 (S.I. 1998 No. 267)
- The Sea Fishing (Enforcement of Community Quota Measures) Order 1998 (S.I. 1998 No. 268)
- The Third Country Fishing (Enforcement) Order 1998 (S.I. 1998 No. 269)
- The Veterinary Surgeons and Veterinary Practitioners (Registration) (Amendment) Regulations Order of Council 1998 (S.I. 1998 No. 270)
- The Veterinary Surgeons (Examination of Commonwealth and Foreign Candidates) (Amendment) Regulations Order of Council 1998 (S.I. 1998 No. 271)
- The Dual-Use and Related Goods (Export Control) (Amendment) Regulations 1998 (S.I. 1998 No. 272)
- The Road Traffic (Special Parking Area) (Royal Borough of Kingston upon Thames) (Amendment) Order 1998 (S.I. 1998 No. 273)
- The Transport and Works Act 1992 (Commencement No. 7) Order 1998 (S.I. 1998 No. 274 (C. 4)])
- The A406 Trunk Road (Hanger Lane and Ashbourne Road, Ealing) (Prohibition of Right-turn) Order 1998 (S.I. 1998 No. 275)
- The Children (Protection at Work) Regulations 1998 (S.I. 1998 No. 276)
- The Criminal Justice and Public Order Act 1994 (Commencement No. 12 and Transitional Provision) Order 1998 (S.I. 1998 No. 277 (C. 5)])
- The Personal Injuries (Civilians) Amendment Scheme 1998 (S.I. 1998 No. 278)
- The Chester Waterworks Company (Constitution and Regulation) Order 1998 (S.I. 1998 No. 281)
- The Council Tax (Exempt Dwellings and Discount Disregards) (Amendment) Order 1998 (S.I. 1998 No. 291)
- The National Heritage Act 1997 (Commencement) Order 1998 (S.I. 1998 No. 292 (C.6)])
- The London Docklands Development Corporation (Alteration of Designated Areas) Order 1998 (S.I. 1998 No. 293)
- The Council Tax (Discount Disregards) (Amendment) Regulations 1998 (S.I. 1998 No. 294)
- The Council Tax (Administration and Enforcement) (Amendment) Regulations 1998 (S.I. 1998 No. 295)

== 301–400 ==
- The Local Authorities (Goods and Services) (Public Bodies) Order 1998 (S.I. 1998 No. 308)
- The Taxes (Interest Rate) (Amendment) Regulations 1998 (S.I. 1998 No. 310)
- The Finance Act 1989, section 178(1), (Appointed Day) Order 1998 (S.I. 1998 No. 311 (C. 7)])
- The Northern Ireland (Emergency Provisions) Act 1996 (Code of Practice) Order 1998 (S.I. 1998 No. 312)
- The Northern Ireland (Emergency Provisions) Act 1996 (Silent Video Recording of Interviews) Order 1998 (S.I. 1998 No. 313)
- The Food Protection (Emergency Prohibitions) (Oil and Chemical Pollution of Fish) Order 1997 (Revocation) Order 1998 (S.I. 1998 No. 314 (S.12)])
- The Church Representation Rules (Amendment) Resolution 1998 (S.I. 1998 No. 319)
- The Housing (Right to Buy) (Priority of Charges) Order 1998 (S.I. 1998 No. 320)
- The Chichester Priority Care Services National Health Service Trust (Establishment) Amendment Order 1998 (S.I. 1998 No. 321)
- The Leeds Community and Mental Health Services Teaching National Health Service Trust (Establishment) Amendment Order 1998 (S.I. 1998 No. 322)
- The Northallerton Health Services National Health Service Trust (Establishment) Amendment Order 1998 (S.I. 1998 No. 323)
- The Local Government Act 1988 (Defined Activities) (Exemption) (Harlow District Council and North Hertfordshire District Council) Order 1998 (S.I. 1998 No. 325)
- The Local Government Act 1988 (Defined Activities) (Exemption) (Luton Borough Council) Order 1998 (S.I. 1998 No. 326)
- The Cardiff to Glan Conwy Trunk Road (A470) (Ty Nant to North of Maentwrog Road Station Improvement) Order 1998 (S.I. 1998 No. 329)
- The Council Tax (Discounts) (Scotland) Amendment Regulations 1998 (S.I. 1998 No. 340 (S.15)])
- The Council Tax (Discounts) (Scotland) Amendment Order 1998 (S.I. 1998 No. 341 (S.16)])
- The Plant Health (Great Britain) (Amendment) Order 1998 (S.I. 1998 No. 349)
- The Police Act 1997 (Commencement No. 5 and Transitional Provisions) Order 1998 (S.I. 1998 No. 354 (C.8)])
- The Devon (Coroners) Order 1998 (S.I. 1998 No. 355)
- The Cheshire (Coroners) Order 1998 (S.I. 1998 No. 356)
- The Essex (Coroners) Order 1998 (S.I. 1998 No. 357)
- The Kent (Coroners) Order 1998 (S.I. 1998 No. 358)
- The Hereford and Worcester (Coroners) Order 1998 (S.I. 1998 No. 359)
- The Lancashire (Coroners) Order 1998 (S.I. 1998 No. 360)
- The Nottinghamshire (Coroners) Order 1998 (S.I. 1998 No. 361)
- The Peterborough (Coroners) Order 1998 (S.I. 1998 No. 362)
- The Shropshire (Coroners) Order 1998 (S.I. 1998 No. 363)
- The Local Government Pension Scheme (Transitional Provisions) (Scotland) Regulations 1998 (S.I. 1998 No. 364 (S. 13)])
- The Local Government Pension Scheme (Scotland) Regulations 1998 (S.I. 1998 No. 366 (S.14)])
- The A40 Trunk Road (Western Avenue, Ealing) (Speed Limits) Order 1998 (S.I. 1998 No. 367)
- The Local Authorities (Capital Finance) (Amendment) Regulations 1998 (S.I. 1998 No. 371)
- The A41 Trunk Road (Camden) Red Route (Bus Lanes) Traffic Order 1998 (S.I. 1998 No. 381)
- The A205 Trunk Road (Greenwich) Red Route Traffic Order 1998 (S.I. 1998 No. 382)
- The A41 Trunk Road (Camden) (Temporary Prohibition of Traffic) Order 1998 (S.I. 1998 No. 383)
- The A4 Trunk Road (Colnbrook By-Pass, Tarmac Way And Stanwell Moor Road, Hillingdon) (Prohibition Of U-Turn) Order 1998 (S.I. 1998 No. 384)
- The A4 Trunk Road (Colnbrook By-Pass, Hillingdon) (50 mph Speed Limit) Order 1998 (S.I. 1998 No. 385)
- The Education Act 1997 (Commencement No. 3 and Transitional Provisions) Order 1998 (S.I. 1998 No. 386 (C.9)])
- The A4 Trunk Road (Bath Road and Hatch Lane, Hillingdon) (Prohibition of U-Turn) Order 1998 (S.I. 1998 No. 387)
- The A4 Trunk Road (Bath Road and Newport Road, Hillingdon) (Prohibition of U-turn) Order 1998 (S.I. 1998 No. 388)
- The Surface Waters (Dangerous Substances) (Classification) Regulations 1998 (S.I. 1998 No. 389)
- The Non-Domestic Rating (Rural Settlements) (Wales) (Amendment) Order 1998 (S.I. 1998 No. 390)
- The Education (Grant-maintained and Grant-maintained Special Schools) (Finance) (Wales) (Amendment) Regulations 1998 (S.I. 1998 No. 391)
- The Education (Grants for Education Support and Training) (Wales) Regulations 1998 (S.I. 1998 No. 392)
- The Non-Domestic Rating (Rural Settlements) (England) Order 1998 (S.I. 1998 No. 393)
- The A205 Trunk Road (Lambeth) Red Route Experimental Traffic Order 1998 (S.I. 1998 No. 394)
- The Public Order (Prescribed Forms) Regulations (Northern Ireland) 1998 (S.I. 1998 No. 395)

== 401–500 ==
- The Guaranteed Minimum Pensions Increase Order 1998 (S.I. 1998 No. 406)
- The Social Security (Incapacity for Work) (General) Amendment Regulations 1998 (S.I. 1998 No. 407)
- The Police Information Technology Organisation (Additional Bodies) Order 1998 (S.I. 1998 No. 411)
- The Education (Special Educational Needs) (Approval of Independent Schools) (Amendment) Regulations 1998 (S.I. 1998 No. 417)
- The Essex County Council (Boroughs of Southend-on-Sea and Thurrock) (Staff Transfer) Order 1998 (S.I. 1998 No. 442)
- The Cambridgeshire County Council (City of Peterborough) (Staff Transfer) Order 1998 (S.I. 1998 No. 443)
- The Hereford and Worcester (Staff Transfer) Order 1998 (S.I. 1998 No. 444)
- The Lancashire County Council (Boroughs of Blackburn with Darwen and Blackpool) (Staff Transfer) Order 1998 (S.I. 1998 No. 445)
- The Cheshire County Council (Boroughs of Halton and Warrington) (Staff Transfer) Order 1998 (S.I. 1998 No. 446)
- The Nottinghamshire County Council (City of Nottingham) (Staff Transfer) Order 1998 (S.I. 1998 No. 447)
- The Shropshire County Council (District of The Wrekin) (Staff Transfer) Order 1998 (S.I. 1998 No. 448)
- The Kent County Council (Borough of Gillingham and City of Rochester upon Medway) (Staff Transfer) Order 1998 (S.I. 1998 No. 449)
- The Berkshire County Council (Staff Transfer) Order 1998 (S.I. 1998 No. 450)
- The Devon County Council (City of Plymouth and Borough of Torbay) (Staff Transfer) Order 1998 (S.I. 1998 No. 451)
- The Spreadable Fats (Marketing Standards) (Amendment) Regulations 1998 (S.I. 1998 No. 452)
- The Common Agricultural Policy (Wine) (Amendment) Regulations 1998 (S.I. 1998 No. 453)
- The Gaming (Bingo) Act (Fees) (Amendment) Order 1998 (S.I. 1998 No. 454)
- The Lotteries (Gaming Board Fees) Order 1998 (S.I. 1998 No. 455)
- The Gaming Act (Variation of Fees) Order 1998 (S.I. 1998 No. 456)
- The London Docklands Development Corporation (Transfer of Property, Rights and Liabilities) (Lee Valley Regional Park Authority) Order 1998 (S.I. 1998 No. 458)
- The Department of Transport (Fees) (Amendment) Order 1998 (S.I. 1998 No. 459)
- The Wireless Telegraphy (Licence Charges) (Amendment) Regulations 1998 (S.I. 1998 No. 460)
- The Criminal Justice Act 1991 (Notice of Transfer) (Amendment) Regulations 1998 (S.I. 1998 No. 461)
- The Town and Country Planning (General Permitted Development) (Amendment) Order 1998 (S.I. 1998 No. 462)
- The Specified Animal Pathogens Order 1998 (S.I. 1998 No. 463)
- The Local Government Reorganisation (Amendment of Coroners Act 1988) Regulations 1998 (S.I. 1998 No. 465)
- The Berkshire (Coroners) Order 1998 (S.I. 1998 No. 466)
- The Highway Litter Clearance and Cleaning (Transfer of Responsibility) Order 1998 (S.I. 1998 No. 467)
- The Sugar Beet (Research and Education) Order 1998 (S.I. 1998 No. 468)
- The Social Security (Contributions) (Re-rating and National Insurance Fund Payments) Order 1998 (S.I. 1998 No. 469)
- The Social Security Benefits Up-rating Order 1998 (S.I. 1998 No. 470)
- The Special Trustees for Westminster and Roehampton Hospitals (Transfer of Trust Property) Order 1998 (S.I. 1998 No. 471)
- The Secure Training Centre Rules 1998 (S.I. 1998 No. 472)
- The Secure Training Centres (Escorts) Rules 1998 (S.I. 1998 No. 473)
- The Criminal Justice and Public Order Act 1994 (Suspension of Custody Officer Certificate) Regulations 1998 (S.I. 1998 No. 474)
- The National Health Service (Dental Charges) Amendment Regulations 1998 (S.I. 1998 No. 490)
- The National Health Service (Charges for Drugs and Appliances) Amendment Regulations 1998 (S.I. 1998 No. 491)
- The National Health Service Trusts (Originating Capital Debt) Order 1998 (S.I. 1998 No. 492)
- The Police (Amendment) Regulations 1998 (S.I. 1998 No. 493)
- The Health and Safety (Enforcing Authority) Regulations 1998 (S.I. 1998 No. 494)
- The Merchant Shipping (Light Dues) (Amendment) Regulations 1998 (S.I. 1998 No. 495)
- The Area Tourist Boards Amending Scheme (Scotland) Order 1998 (S.I. 1998 No. 496 (S.17)])
- The National Assistance (Assessment of Resources) (Amendment) Regulations 1998 (S.I. 1998 No. 497)
- The National Assistance (Sums forPersonal Requirements) Regulations 1998 (S.I. 1998 No. 498)
- The National Health Service (Optical Charges and Payments) Amendment Regulations 1998 (S.I. 1998 No. 499)
- The Shropshire's Community and Mental Health Services National Health Service Trust (Establishment) Order 1998 (S.I. 1998 No. 500)

== 501–600 ==
- The Surrey Hampshire Borders National Health Service Trust (Establishment) Order 1998 (S.I. 1998 No. 501)
- The Dissolution of the North Downs Community Health National Health Service Trust and the Heathlands Mental Health National Health Service Trust Order 1998 (S.I. 1998 No. 502)
- The Pensions Increase (Review) Order 1998 (S.I. 1998 No. 503)
- The Building Societies (Accounts and Related Provisions) Regulations 1998 (S.I. 1998 No. 504)
- The Public Telecommunication System Designation (Telegroup UK Limited) Order 1998 (S.I. 1998 No. 505)
- The Public Telecommunication System Designation (Sonic Telecommunications International Limited) Order 1998 (S.I. 1998 No. 506)
- The Public Telecommunication System Designation (Primetec (UK) Limited) Order 1998 (S.I. 1998 No. 507)
- The Public Telecommunication System Designation (LCI Telecom UK Limited) Order 1998 (S.I. 1998 No. 508)
- The Public Telecommunication System Designation (Telecom Ireland Limited) Order 1998 (S.I. 1998 No. 509)
- The Public Telecommunication System Designation (Easynet Group Plc) Order 1998 (S.I. 1998 No. 510)
- The Public Telecommunication System Designation (Atlantic Telecommunications Limited) Order 1998 (S.I. 1998 No. 511)
- The Public Telecommunication System Designation (Esprit Telecom UK Limited) Order 1998 (S.I. 1998 No. 512)
- The Public Telecommunication System Designation (North American Gateway Limited) Order 1998 (S.I. 1998 No. 513)
- The Public Telecommunication System Designation (TGC UK Limited) Order 1998 (S.I. 1998 No. 514)
- The Shropshire's Community Health Service National Health Service Trust (Dissolution) Order 1998 (S.I. 1998 No. 515)
- The Dissolution of the South Warwickshire Health Care National Health Service Trust and the South Warwickshire Mental Health National Health Service Trust Order 1998 (S.I. 1998 No. 516)
- The South Warwickshire Combined Care National Health Service Trust (Establishment) Order 1998 (S.I. 1998 No. 517)
- The Shropshire's Mental Health National Health Service Trust (Dissolution) Order 1998 (S.I. 1998 No. 518)
- The Non-Domestic Rates (Levying) (Scotland) Regulations 1998 (S.I. 1998 No. 519 (S.18)])
- The Social Security (Industrial Injuries) (Dependency) (Permitted Earnings Limits) Order 1998 (S.I. 1998 No. 520)
- The Social Security Benefits Up-rating Regulations 1998 (S.I. 1998 No. 521)
- The Statutory Maternity Pay (Compensation of Employers) Amendment Regulations 1998 (S.I. 1998 No. 522)
- The Social Security (Contributions) Amendment Regulations 1998 (S.I. 1998 No. 523)
- The Social Security (Contributions) (Re-rating) Consequential Amendment Regulations 1998 (S.I. 1998 No. 524)
- The Public Processions (Northern Ireland) Act 1998 (Code of Conduct) Order 1998 (S.I. 1998 No. 525)
- The Public Processions (Northern Ireland) Act 1998 (Procedural Rules) Order 1998 (S.I. 1998 No. 526)
- The Public Processions (Northern Ireland) Act 1998 (Guidelines) Order 1998 (S.I. 1998 No. 527)
- The Motor Vehicles (Driving Licences) (Amendment) (No. 2) Regulations 1998 (S.I. 1998 No. 528)
- The Local Authorities (Capital Finance) (Rate of Discount for 1998/99) Regulations 1998 (S.I. 1998 No. 529)
- The Local Government Pension Scheme (Amendment) Regulations 1998 (S.I. 1998 No. 530)
- The Merchant Shipping (Fees) (Amendment) Regulations 1998 (S.I. 1998 No. 531)
- The Civil Aviation (Navigation Services Charges) Regulations 1998 (S.I. 1998 No. 532)
- The Local Authorities (Direct Labour Organisations) (Competition) (Insolvency) (Amendment) (Wales) Regulations 1998 (S.I. 1998 No. 537)
- The Financial Assistance for Environmental Purposes Order 1998 (S.I. 1998 No. 538)
- The Rhondda Health Care National Health Service Trust (Transfer of Trust Property) Order 1998 (S.I. 1998 No. 539)
- The Glan-y-Môr National Health Service Trust (Transfer of Trust Property) Order 1998 (S.I. 1998 No. 540)
- The Glan Hafren National Health Service Trust (Transfer of Trust Property) Order 1998 (S.I. 1998 No. 541)
- The Control of Lead at Work Regulations 1998 (S.I. 1998 No. 543)
- The Environmental Protection (Controls on Hexachloroethane) Regulations 1998 (S.I. 1998 No. 545)
- The Local Authorities (Members' Allowances) (Amendment) Regulations 1998 (S.I. 1998 No. 556)
- The Local Authorities (Members' Allowances) (Amendment) (No. 2) Regulations 1998 (S.I. 1998 No. 557)
- The Wireless Telegraphy (Television Licence Fees) (Amendment) Regulations 1998 (S.I. 1998 No. 558)
- The Local Government (Discretionary Payments) (Amendment) Regulations 1998 (S.I. 1998 No. 559)
- The Finance Act 1997 (Commencement No. 2) Order 1998 (S.I. 1998 No. 560 (C. 10)])
- The Council Tax (Exempt Dwellings) (Scotland) Amendment Order 1998 (S.I. 1998 No. 561 (S.19)])
- The Income-related Benefits (Subsidy to Authorities) Order 1998 (S.I. 1998 No. 562)
- The Social Security (Miscellaneous Amendments) Regulations 1998 (S.I. 1998 No. 563)
- The National Health Service (Remuneration and Conditions of Service) (Amendment) Regulations 1998 (S.I. 1998 No. 564)
- The Disability Discrimination (Repeal of section 17 of, and Schedule 2 to, the Disabled Persons (Employment) Act, 1944) Order 1998 (S.I. 1998 No. 565)
- The Housing Benefit (Permitted Totals) (Amendment) Order 1998 (S.I. 1998 No. 566)
- The A59 Trunk Road (A56 Junction Improvement) Order 1998 (S.I. 1998 No. 567)
- The Local Government Pension Scheme (Amendment) (Environment Agency) Regulations 1998 (S.I. 1998 No. 568)
- The London Docklands Development Corporation (Transfer of Property, Rights and Liabilities) (Urban Regeneration Agency) Order 1998 (S.I. 1998 No. 569)
- The Teesside Development Corporation (Transfer of Undertaking and Functions) Order 1998 (S.I. 1998 No. 570)
- The Workmen's Compensation (Supplementation) (Amendment) Scheme 1998 (S.I. 1998 No. 571)
- The Road Vehicles Registration Fee Regulations 1998 (S.I. 1998 No. 572)
- The Local Government Act 1988 (Defined Activities) (Exemption) (Tunbridge Wells Borough Council) Order 1998 (S.I. 1998 No. 573)
- The Medicines for Human Use and Medical Devices (Fees and Miscellaneous Amendments) Regulations 1998 (S.I. 1998 No. 574)
- The Road Traffic (Special Parking Areas) (The London Borough of Wandsworth) (Amendment) Order 1998 (S.I. 1998 No. 575)
- The Sunderland and Tyne Riverside Enterprise Zones (Designation of Enterprise Zone Authorities) Order 1998 (S.I. 1998 No. 576)
- The Police Pensions (Amendment) Regulations 1998 (S.I. 1998 No. 577)
- The Local Elections (Principal Areas) (Amendment) Rules 1998 (S.I. 1998 No. 578)
- The Local Government Act 1988 (Defined Activities) (Exemption) (No. 1) Order 1998 (S.I. 1998 No. 579)
- The Local Government Act 1988 (Defined Activities) (Exemption) (No. 2) Order 1998 (S.I. 1998 No. 580)
- The Injuries in War (Shore Employments) Compensation (Amendment) Scheme 1998 (S.I. 1998 No. 581)
- The Charter Trustees (Hereford) Order 1998 (S.I. 1998 No. 582)
- The Combined Probation Areas (Leicestershire and Rutland) Order 1998 (S.I. 1998 No. 584)
- The Local Elections (Parishes and Communities) (Amendment) Rules 1998 (S.I. 1998 No. 585)
- The Suspension from Work on Maternity Grounds (Merchant Shipping and Fishing Vessels) Order 1998 (S.I. 1998 No. 587)
- The Public Record Office (Fees) Regulations 1998 (S.I. 1998 No. 599)
- The Occupational and Personal Pension Schemes (Levy and Register) (Amendments) Regulations 1998 (S.I. 1998 No. 600)

== 601–700 ==
- The Local Authorities (Capital Finance) (Amendment) (No. 2) Regulations 1998 (S.I. 1998 No. 602)
- The Forestry (Exceptions from Restrictions of Felling) (Amendment) Regulations 1998 (S.I. 1998 No. 603)
- The Environment Act 1995 (Commencement No. 11) Order 1998 (S.I. 1998 No. 604 (C.11)])
- The Controlled Waste (Registration of Carriers and Seizure of Vehicles) (Amendment) Regulations 1998 (S.I. 1998 No. 605)
- The Waste Management Licensing (Amendment) Regulations 1998 (S.I. 1998 No. 606)
- The Environmental Protection (Waste Recycling Payments) (Amendment) Regulations 1998 (S.I. 1998 No. 607)
- The Offshore Installations (Safety Zones) Order 1998 (S.I. 1998 No. 608)
- The National Health Service (Charges for Drugs and Appliances) (Scotland) Amendment Regulations 1998 (S.I. 1998 No. 609 (S.20)])
- The National Health Service (Dental Charges) (Scotland) Amendment Regulations 1998 (S.I. 1998 No. 610 (S.21)])
- The Police Grant (Scotland) Order 1998 (S.I. 1998 No. 611 (S.22)])
- The Insurance (Fees) Regulations 1998 (S.I. 1998 No. 612)
- The Museums and Galleries Act 1992 (Amendment) Order 1998 (S.I. 1998 No. 613)
- The Local Government Changes for England (Education) (Miscellaneous Provisions) Order 1998 (S.I. 1998 No. 614)
- The Adopted Persons (Contact Register) (Fees) (Amendment) Rules 1998 (S.I. 1998 No. 615)
- The Beef Labelling (Enforcement) Regulations 1998 (S.I. 1998 No. 616)
- The Superannuation (Admission to Schedule 1 to the Superannuation Act 1972) Order 1998 (S.I. 1998 No. 618)
- The A136 Trunk Road (Station Road, Parkeston) (Detrunking) Order 1998 (S.I. 1998 No. 630)
- The National Health Service (Primary Care) Act 1997 (Commencement No. 4) Order 1998 (S.I. 1998 No. 631 (C.12)])
- The National Health Service (Functions of Health Authorities) (Prescribing Incentive Schemes) Regulations 1998 (S.I. 1998 No. 632)
- The Water Services Charges (Billing and Collection) (Scotland) Order 1998 (S.I. 1998 No. 634 (S.25)])
- The Domestic Sewerage Charges (Reduction) (Scotland) Regulations 1998 (S.I. 1998 No. 635 (S.26)])
- The NCIS (Discipline) (Senior Police Members) Regulations 1998 (S.I. 1998 No. 636)
- The National Crime Squad (Discipline) (Senior Police Members) Regulations 1998 (S.I. 1998 No. 637)
- The National Crime Squad (Complaints) Regulations 1998 (S.I. 1998 No. 638)
- The National Crime Squad (Senior Police Members) (Appeals) Order 1998 (S.I. 1998 No. 639)
- The NCIS (Senior Police Members) (Appeals) Order 1998 (S.I. 1998 No. 640)
- The NCIS (Complaints) Regulations 1998 (S.I. 1998 No. 641)
- The National Health Service (Optical Charges and Payments) (Scotland) Regulations 1998 (S.I. 1998 No. 642 (S.23)])
- The Births, Deaths, Marriages and Divorces (Fees) (Scotland) Regulations 1998 (S.I. 1998 No. 643 (S.24)])
- The Local Education Authority (Behaviour Support Plans) Regulations 1998 (S.I. 1998 No. 644)
- The National Health Service (Pilot Schemes: Miscellaneous Provisions and Consequential Amendments) Regulations 1998 (S.I. 1998 No. 646)
- The Local Government Act 1988 (Defined Activities) (Exemption) (Basildon, Derwentside and Salisbury District Councils) Order 1998 (S.I. 1998 No.647)
- The Construction Contracts (England and Wales) Exclusion Order 1998 (S.I. 1998 No. 648)
- The Scheme for Construction Contracts (England and Wales) Regulations 1998 (S.I. 1998 No. 649)
- The Housing Grants, Construction and Regeneration Act (England and Wales) (Commencement No. 4) Order 1998 (S.I. 1998 No. 650 (C. 13)])
- The Surrey and Sussex Healthcare National Health Service Trust (Establishment) Order 1998 (S.I. 1998 No. 651)
- The Dissolution of the Surrey Heartlands National Health Service Trust and the East Surrey Priority Care National Health Service Trust Order 1998 (S.I. 1998 No. 652)
- The Surrey Oaklands National Health Service Trust (Establishment) Order 1998 (S.I. 1998 No. 653)
- The London Traffic Control System (Transfer) (Amendment) Order 1998 (S.I. 1998 No. 654)
- The Nursery Education (England) Regulations 1998 (S.I. 1998 No. 655)
- The Education (Grants for Education Support and Training) (England) Regulations 1998 (S.I. 1998 No. 656)
- The National Health Service (Service Committees and Tribunal) (Scotland) Amendment Regulations 1998 (S.I. 1998 No. 657 (S. 27)])
- The National Health Service (Fund-holding Practices) (Scotland) Amendment Regulations 1998 (S.I. 1998 No. 658 (S.28)])
- The National Health Service (Choice of Medical Practitioner) (Scotland) Regulations 1998 (S.I. 1998 No. 659 (S.29)])
- The National Health Service (General Medical Services) (Scotland) Amendment (No.2) Regulations 1998 (S.I. 1998 No. 660 (S.30)])
- The Nursing Homes Registration (Scotland) Amendment Regulations 1998 (S.I. 1998 No. 661 (S.31)])
- The Legal Aid in Criminal and Care Proceedings (General) (Amendment) Regulations 1998 (S.I. 1998 No. 662)
- The Legal Advice and Assistance (Amendment) Regulations 1998 (S.I. 1998 No. 663)
- The Civil Legal Aid (Assessment of Resources) (Amendment) Regulations 1998 (S.I. 1998 No. 664)
- The National Health Service (Pilot Schemes: Part II Practitioners) Regulations 1998 (S.I. 1998 No. 665)
- The National Health Service Pension Scheme (Amendment) Regulations 1998 (S.I. 1998 No. 666)
- The National Health Service (Injury Benefits) Amendment Regulations 1998 (S.I. 1998 No. 667)
- The National Health Service (Choice of Medical Practitioner) Regulations 1998 (S.I. 1998 No. 668)
- The National Health Service (Vocational Training for General Medical Practice) Amendment Regulations 1998 (S.I. 1998 No. 669)
- The North Wales Ambulance National Health Service Trust (Dissolution) Order 1998 (S.I. 1998 No. 670)
- The Mid Glamorgan Ambulance National Health Service Trust (Dissolution) Order 1998 (S.I. 1998 No. 671)
- The Industrial and Provident Societies (Credit Unions) (Amendment of Fees) Regulations 1998 (S.I. 1998 No. 672)
- The Friendly Societies (General Charge and Fees) Regulations 1998 (S.I. 1998 No. 673)
- The National Health Service (Service Committees and Tribunal) Amendment Regulations 1998 (S.I. 1998 No. 674)
- The Building Societies (General Charge and Fees) Regulations 1998 (S.I. 1998 No. 675)
- The Industrial and Provident Societies (Amendment of Fees) Regulations 1998 (S.I. 1998 No. 676)
- The West Wales Ambulance National Health Service Trust (Dissolution) Order 1998 (S.I. 1998 No. 677)
- The Welsh Ambulance Services National Health Service Trust (Establishment) Order 1998 (S.I. 1998 No. 678)
- The South and East Wales Ambulance National Health Service Trust (Dissolution) Order 1998 (S.I. 1998 No. 679)
- The Social Security (Contributions) Amendment (No. 2) Regulations 1998 (S.I. 1998 No. 680)
- The National Health Service (Pharmaceutical Services) Amendment Regulations 1998 (S.I. 1998 No. 681)
- The National Health Service (General Medical Services) Amendment Regulations 1998 (S.I. 1998 No. 682)
- The Porthmadog Harbour Revision Order 1998 (S.I. 1998 No. 683)
- The River Ewe Salmon Fishery District (Baits and Lures) Regulations 1998 (S.I. 1998 No. 684 (S. 32)])
- The Broadcasting Digital Terrestrial Sound (Technical Service) Order 1998 (S.I. 1998 No. 685)
- The Construction Contracts (Scotland) Exclusion Order 1998 (S.I. 1998 No. 686 (S.33)])
- The Scheme for Construction Contracts (Scotland) Regulations 1998 (S.I. 1998 No. 687 (S.34)])
- The Valuation and Rating (Exempted Classes) (Scotland) Order 1998 (S.I. 1998 No. 688 (S.35)])
- The Welfare Food (Amendment) Regulations 1998 (S.I. 1998 No. 691)
- The Dissolution of the Crawley Horsham National Health Service Trust and the East Surrey Healthcare National Health Service Trust Order 1998 (S.I. 1998 No. 692)
- The National Health Service (Fund-holding Amendment Regulations 1998 Practices) (S.I. 1998 No. 693)
- The Local Government and Rating Act 1997 (Commencement No. 4) Order 1998 (S.I. 1998 No. 694 (C.14)])
- The Local Government Act 1988 (Defined Activities) (Exemption) (Maidstone Borough Council) Order 1998 (S.I. 1998 No. 695)

== 701–800 ==
- The Public Processions (Northern Ireland) Act 1998 (Commencement) Order 1998 (S.I. 1998 No. 717 (C.15)])
- The Teachers' Superannuation (Scotland) Amendment Regulations 1998 (S.I. 1998 No. 718 (S.36)])
- The Teachers (Compensation for Premature Retirement and Redundancy) (Scotland) Amendment Regulations 1998 (S.I. 1998 No. 719 (S.37)])
- The Wireless Telegraphy (Control of Interference from Videosenders) Order 1998 (S.I. 1998 No. 722)
- The Education (London Residuary Body) (Property Transfer) (Modification and Amendment) Order 1998 (S.I. 1998 No. 723)
- The Advice and Assistance (Scotland) Amendment Regulations 1998 (S.I. 1998 No. 724 (S.38)])
- The Civil Legal Aid (Scotland) Amendment Regulations 1998 (S.I. 1998 No. 725 (S.39)])
- The Industrial Training Levy (Engineering Construction Board) Order 1998 (S.I. 1998 No. 726)
- The Industrial Training Levy (Construction Board) Order 1998 (S.I. 1998 No. 727)
- The Retirement Benefits Schemes (Restriction on Discretion to Approve) (Small Self-administered Schemes) (Amendment) Regulations 1998 (S.I. 1998 No. 728)
- The Retirement Benefits Schemes (Restriction on Discretion to Approve) (Excepted Provisions) Regulations 1998 (S.I. 1998 No. 729)
- The European Communities (Designation) Order 1998 (S.I. 1998 No. 745)
- The Greater London Authority (Referendum Arrangements) Order 1998 (S.I. 1998 No. 746)
- Appropriation (Northern Ireland) Order 1998 (S.I. 1998 No. 747 (N.I. 3)])
- The Civil Aviation Act 1982 (Jersey) (Amendment) Order 1998 (S.I. 1998 No. 748)
- Financial Provisions (Northern Ireland) Order 1998 (S.I. 1998 No. 749 (N.I. 4)])
- The Misuse of Drugs Act 1971 (Modification) Order 1998 (S.I. 1998 No. 750)
- The United Reformed Church Acts 1972 and 1981 (Jersey) Order 1998 (S.I. 1998 No. 751)
- The Proceeds of Crime (Scotland) Act 1995 (Enforcement of Northern Ireland Orders) Order 1998 (S.I. 1998 No. 752 (S.42)])
- The Air Navigation (Third Amendment) Order 1998 (S.I. 1998 No. 753)
- The Northwick Park and St. Mark's National Health Service Trust (Establishment) Amendment Order 1998 (S.I. 1998 No. 754)
- The Income Tax (Indexation) Order 1998 (S.I. 1998 No. 755)
- The Inheritance Tax (Indexation) Order 1998 (S.I. 1998 No. 756)
- The Capital Gains Tax (Annual Exempt Amount) Order 1998 (S.I. 1998 No. 757)
- The Retirement Benefits Schemes (Indexationof Earnings Cap) Order 1998 (S.I. 1998 No. 758)
- The Value Added Tax (Cars) (Amendment) Order 1998 (S.I. 1998 No. 759)
- The Value Added Tax (Special Provisions) (Amendment) Order 1998 (S.I. 1998 No. 760)
- The Value Added Tax (Increase of Registration Limits) Order 1998 (S.I. 1998 No. 761)
- The Value Added Tax (Supply of Services) (Amendment) Order 1998 (S.I. 1998 No. 762)
- The Value Added Tax (Place of Supply of Services) (Amendment) Order 1998 (S.I. 1998 No. 763)
- The Value Added Tax (Sport, Sports Competitions and Physical Education) Order 1998 (S.I. 1998 No. 764)
- The Value Added Tax (Amendment) (No. 2) Regulations 1998 (S.I. 1998 No. 765)
- The Social Security Amendment (Lone Parents) Regulations 1998 (S.I. 1998 No. 766)
- The Environmental Protection (Prescribed Processes and Substances) (Amendment) (Hazardous Waste Incineration) Regulations 1998 (S.I. 1998 No. 767)
- The Prevention of Terrorism (Temporary Provisions) Act 1989 (Partial Continuance) Order 1998 (S.I. 1998 No. 768)
- The Urban Development Corporations in England (Area and Constitution) Order 1998 (S.I. 1998 No. 769)
- The Llandough Hospital and Community National Health Service Trust (Establishment) Amendment Order 1998 (S.I. 1998 No. 770)
- The National Health Service Trusts (Originating Capital Debt) (Wales) Order 1998 (S.I. 1998 No. 771)
- The Environment Act 1995 (Commencement No. 12 and Transitional Provisions) (Scotland) Order 1998 (S.I. 1998 No. 781 (S. 40) (C. 16)])
- The Combined Probation Areas (Hertfordshire) Order 1998 (S.I. 1998 No. 782)
- The Dissolution of the Royal Brompton Hospital National Health Service Trust and the Harefield Hospital National Health Service Trust Order 1998 (S.I. 1998 No. 783)
- The Royal Brompton and Harefield National Health Service Trust (Establishment) Order 1998 (S.I. 1998 No. 784)
- The Value Added Tax (Increase of Consideration for Fuel) Order 1998 (S.I. 1998 No. 788)
- The Education (New Grant-maintained Schools) (Finance) Regulations 1998 (S.I. 1998 No. 798)
- The Education (Grant-maintained and Grant-maintained Special Schools) (Finance) Regulations 1998 (S.I. 1998 No. 799)
- The Dissolution of the Ashford Hospital National Health Service Trust and the St. Peter's Hospital National Health Service Trust Order 1998 (S.I. 1998 No. 800)

== 801–900 ==
- The Ashford and St. Peter's Hospitals National Health Service Trust (Establishment) Order 1998 (S.I. 1998 No. 801)
- The European Parliamentary Elections (Day of By-election) (Yorkshire South Constituency) Order 1998 (S.I. 1998 No. 802)
- The London Docklands Development Corporation (Transfer of Functions) Order 1998 (S.I. 1998 No. 803)
- The Hairmyres and Stonehouse Hospitals National Health Service Trust (Establishment) Amendment Order 1998 (S.I. 1998 No. 804 (S.41)])
- The Thames Gateway National Health Service Trust (Establishment) Order 1998 (S.I. 1998 No. 805)
- The Horton General Hospital National Health Service Trust (Dissolution) Order 1998 (S.I. 1998 No. 806)
- The Dissolution of the North Kent Healthcare National Health Service Trust and the Thameslink Healthcare Services National Health Service Trust Order 1998 (S.I. 1998 No. 807)
- The Housing Renewal Grants (Amendment) Regulations 1998 (S.I. 1998 No. 808)
- The Housing Renewal Grants (Prescribed Form and Particulars) (Amendment) Regulations 1998 (S.I. 1998 No. 809)
- The Relocation Grants (Form of Application) (Amendment) Regulations 1998 (S.I. 1998 No. 810)
- The European Primary and Specialist Dental Qualifications Regulations 1998 (S.I. 1998 No. 811)
- The Walsgrave Hospitals National Health Service Trust (Establishment) Amendment Order 1998 (S.I. 1998 No. 812)
- The Rugby National Health Service Trust (Dissolution) Order 1998 (S.I. 1998 No. 813)
- The North Warwickshire National Health Service Trust (Establishment) Amendment Order 1998 (S.I. 1998 No. 814)
- The Lancaster Priority Services National Health Service Trust (Dissolution) Order 1998 (S.I. 1998 No. 815)
- The Morecambe Bay Hospitals National Health Service Trust (Establishment) Order 1998 (S.I. 1998 No. 816)
- The Lancaster Acute Hospitals National Health Service Trust (Dissolution) Order 1998 (S.I. 1998 No. 817)
- The Westmorland Hospitals National Health Service Trust (Dissolution) Order 1998 (S.I. 1998 No. 818)
- The South Cumbria Community and Mental Health National Health Service Trust (Dissolution) Order 1998 (S.I. 1998 No. 819)
- The Furness Hospitals National Health Service Trust (Dissolution) Order 1998 (S.I. 1998 No. 820)
- The Bay Community National Health Service Trust (Establishment) Order 1998 (S.I. 1998 No. 821)
- The Community Health Care: North Durham National Health Service Trust (Dissolution) Order 1998 (S.I. 1998 No. 822)
- The Bishop Auckland Hospitals National Health Service Trust (Dissolution) Order 1998 (S.I. 1998 No. 823)
- The Gateshead Hospitals National Health Service Trust (Dissolution) Order 1998 (S.I. 1998 No. 824)
- The Cheviot and Wansbeck, North Tyneside Health Care, and Northumberland Community Health National Health Service Trusts (Dissolution) Order 1998 (S.I. 1998 No. 825)
- The Gateshead Healthcare National Health Service Trust (Dissolution) Order 1998 (S.I. 1998 No. 826)
- The Newcastle upon Tyne Hospitals National Health Service Trust (Establishment) Order 1998 (S.I. 1998 No. 827)
- The South Durham National Health Service Trust (Dissolution) Order 1998 (S.I. 1998 No. 828)
- The Durham County Priority Services National Health Service Trust (Establishment) Order 1998 (S.I. 1998 No. 829)
- The North Durham Acute Hospitals National Health Service Trust (Dissolution) Order 1998 (S.I. 1998 No. 830)
- The Freeman Group of Hospitals and the Royal Victoria Infirmary and Associated Hospitals National Health Service Trusts (Dissolution) Order 1998 (S.I. 1998 No. 831)
- The South Durham Health Care National Health Service Trust (Establishment) Order 1998 (S.I. 1998 No. 832)
- The Darlington Memorial Hospital National Health Service Trust (Dissolution) Order 1998 (S.I. 1998 No. 833)
- The Gateshead Health National Health Service Trust (Establishment) Order 1998 (S.I. 1998 No. 834)
- The North Durham Health Care National Health Service Trust (Establishment) Order 1998 (S.I. 1998 No. 835)
- The Northumbria Health Care National Health Service Trust (Establishment) Order 1998 (S.I. 1998 No. 836)
- The Leeds Teaching Hospitals National Health Service Trust (Establishment) Order 1998 (S.I. 1998 No. 837)
- The United Leeds Teaching Hospitals National Health Service Trust (Dissolution) Order 1998 (S.I. 1998 No. 838)
- The St. James and Seacroft University Hospitals National Health Service Trust (Dissolution) Order 1998 (S.I. 1998 No. 839)
- The Canterbury and Thanet Community Healthcare National Health Service Trust (Establishment) Amendment Order 1998 (S.I. 1998 No. 845)
- The South Kent Community Healthcare National Health Service Trust (Dissolution) Order 1998 (S.I. 1998 No. 846)
- The Southern Derbyshire Acute Hospitals National Health Service Trust (Establishment) Order 1998 (S.I. 1998 No. 848)
- The Derbyshire Royal Infirmary National Health Service Trust (Dissolution) Order 1998 (S.I. 1998 No. 849)
- The Derby City General Hospital National Health Service Trust (Dissolution) Order 1998 (S.I. 1998 No. 850)
- The Criminal Procedure and Investigations Act 1996 (Appointed Day No. 8) Order 1998 (S.I. 1998 No. 851 (C. 17)])
- The Video Recordings (Labelling) (Amendment) Regulations 1998 (S.I. 1998 No. 852)
- The Social Security (Miscellaneous Amendments) (No. 2) Regulations 1998 (S.I. 1998 No. 865)
- The A41 Trunk Road (Camden) (Temporary Prohibition of Traffic) (No.2) Order 1998 (S.I. 1998 No. 866)
- The London Borough of Haringey (Trunk Roads) Red Route (Bus Lanes) Traffic Order 1997 Variation Order 1998 (S.I. 1998 No. 867)
- The Local Authorities (Goods and Services) (Public Bodies) (No. 2) Order 1998 (S.I. 1998 No. 868)
- The Cattle Identification Regulations 1998 (S.I. 1998 No. 871)
- The Osteopaths Act 1993 (Commencement No. 2) Order 1998 (S.I. 1998 No. 872 (C.18)])
- The Housing Support Grant (Scotland) Variation Order 1998 (S.I. 1998 No. 873 (S.43)])
- The Housing Support Grant (Scotland) Order 1998 (S.I. 1998 No. 874 (S.44)])
- The Education (Listed Bodies) (Amendment) Order 1998 (S.I. 1998 No. 876)
- The Education (Individual Pupils' Achievements) (Information) (Amendment) Regulations 1998 (S.I. 1998 No. 877)
- The Wildlife and Countryside Act 1981 (Variation of Schedules 5 and 8) Order 1998 (S.I. 1998 No. 878)
- The Agriculture Act 1986 (Commencement No. 6)Order 1998 (S.I. 1998 No. 879 (C. 19)])
- The Education (Publication of Local Education Authority Inspection Reports) Regulations 1998 (S.I. 1998 No. 880)
- The Misuse of Drugs (Designation) (Variation) Order 1998 (S.I. 1998 No. 881)
- The Misuse of Drugs (Amendment) Regulations 1998 (S.I. 1998 No. 882)
- The A205 Trunk Road (Lambeth) Red Route (Prohibition of Traffic) Experimental Traffic Order 1998 (S.I. 1998 No. 883)
- The A205 Trunk Road (Lewisham) Red Route (Bus Lanes) Traffic Order 1998 (S.I. 1998 No. 884)
- Act of Sederunt (Rules of the Court of Session Amendment) (Miscellaneous) 1998 (S.I. 1998 No. 890 (S.45)])
- The Police Grant (No. 2) (Scotland) Order 1998 (S.I. 1998 No. 891 (S.46)])
- The Mines (Notice of Abandonment) Regulations 1998 (S.I. 1998 No. 892)
- The Northern Ireland Arms Decommissioning Act 1997 (Amnesty Period) Order 1998 (S.I. 1998 No. 893)
- The Housing Grants, Construction and Regeneration Act 1996 (Scotland) (Commencement No. 5) Order 1998 (S.I. 1998 No. 894 (C. 20) (S.47)])
- The Lewisham and Guy's Mental Health National Health Service Trust (Transfers of Trust Property) Order 1998 (S.I. 1998 No. 895)
- The Lincolnshire Ambulance and Health Transport Service National Health Service Trust (Transfer of Trust Property) Order 1998 (S.I. 1998 No. 896)
- The Special Trustees for University College Hospital (Transfer of Trust Property) Order 1998 (S.I. 1998 No. 897)
- The Local Government Staff Commission (England) (Winding Up) Order 1998 (S.I. 1998 No. 898)
- The Dual-Use and Related Goods (Export Control) (Amendment No. 2) Regulations 1998 (S.I. 1998 No. 899)
- The Legal Aid (Mediation in Family Matters) (Amendment) Regulations 1998 (S.I. 1998 No. 900)

== 901–1000 ==
- The Pelican and Puffin Pedestrian Crossings General (Amendment) Directions 1998 (S.I. 1998 No. 901)
- The Residential Care Homes and the Nursing Homes and Mental Nursing Homes (Amendment) Regulations 1998 (S.I. 1998 No. 902)
- The Education (School Teachers' Pay and Conditions) Order 1998 (S.I. 1998 No. 903)
- The Northamptonshire County Council (A45 Nene Valley Way Widening) (Bridge Over The River Nene) Scheme 1997 Confirmation Instrument 1998 (S.I. 1998 No. 904)
- The Council Tax Benefit (General) Amendment Regulations 1998 (S.I. 1998 No. 911)
- The Monklands and Bellshill Hospitals National Health Service Trust (Establishment) (Change of Name and Amendment) Order 1998 (S.I. 1998 No. 922 (S.48)])
- The Conservation of Seals (Common Seals) (Shetland Islands Area) Order 1991 Revocation Order 1998 (S.I. 1998 No. 923 (S. 49)])
- The Employment Rights (Increase of Limits) Order 1998 (S.I. 1998 No. 924)
- The Trade Marks (Amendment) Rules 1998 (S.I. 1998 No. 925)
- The Law Hospital National Health Service Trust (Establishment) Amendment Order 1998 (S.I. 1998 No. 926 (S.50)])
- The Fishing Vessels (Life-Saving Appliances) (Amendment) Regulations 1998 (S.I. 1998 No. 927)
- The Fishing Vessels (Safety Provisions) (Amendment) Rules 1998 (S.I. 1998 No. 928)
- The Merchant Shipping (Crew Accommodation) (Fishing Vessels) (Amendment) Regulations 1998 (S.I. 1998 No. 929)
- The Fossil Fuel Levy Act 1998 (Commencement) Order 1998 (S.I. 1998 No. 930 (C.21)])
- The Legal Services Ombudsman (Jurisdiction) (Amendment) Order 1998 (S.I. 1998 No. 935)
- The A41 Trunk Road (Westminster) Red Route (No. 2) Traffic Order 1998 (S.I. 1998 No. 938)
- The A3 Trunk Road (Wandsworth) Red Route Experimental Traffic Order 1998 (S.I. 1998 No. 939)
- The Social Security (Minimum Contributions to Appropriate Personal Pension Schemes) Order 1998 (S.I. 1998 No. 944)
- The Social Security (Reduced Rates of Class 1 Contributions, and Rebates) (Money Purchase Contracted-out Schemes) Order 1998 (S.I. 1998 No. 945)
- The Railways (Rateable Values) (Scotland) Order 1998 (S.I. 1998 No. 947 (S.51)])
- The Local Authorities (Transport Charges) Regulations 1998 (S.I. 1998 No. 948)
- The Urban Development Corporations in England (Dissolution) Order 1998 (S.I. 1998 No. 953)
- The Fertilisers (Mammalian Meat and Bone Meal) Regulations 1998 (S.I. 1998 No. 954)
- The Fertilisers (Mammalian Meat and Bone Meal) (Conditions of Manufacture) Regulations 1998 (S.I. 1998 No. 955)
- The Public Processions (Northern Ireland) Act 1998 (Notice of Processions) (Exceptions) Order 1998 (S.I. 1998 No. 956)
- The Lifespan Health Care Cambridge National Health Service Trust (Establishment) Amendment Order 1998 (S.I. 1998 No. 957)
- The Gaming Clubs (Hours and Charges) (Amendment) Regulations 1998 (S.I. 1998 No. 961)
- The Gaming Act (Variation of Monetary Limits) Order 1998 (S.I. 1998 No. 962)
- The Road Traffic Act 1991 (Commencement No. 15 and Transitional Provisions) Order 1998 (S.I. 1998 No. 967 (C.22)])
- The Offshore Petroleum Production and Pipe-lines (Assessment of Environmental Effects) Regulations 1998 (S.I. 1998 No. 968)
- The Criminal Legal Aid (Scotland) (Prescribed Proceedings) Amendment Regulations 1998 (S.I. 1998 No. 969 (S.52)])
- The Civil Legal Aid (Financial Conditions) (Scotland) Regulations 1998 (S.I. 1998 No. 970 (S.53)])
- The Advice and Assistance (Financial Conditions) (Scotland) Regulations 1998 (S.I. 1998 No. 971 (S.54)])
- The Advice and Assistance (Assistance by Way of Representation) (Scotland) Amendment Regulations 1998 (S.I. 1998 No. 972 (S.55)])
- The East London and The City Health Authority (Transfers of Trust Property) Order 1998 (S.I. 1998 No. 977)
- The Street Works (Inspection Fees) (Amendment) Regulations 1998 (S.I. 1998 No. 978)
- The A205 Trunk Road (Greenwich) Red Route Experimental Traffic Order 1997 Variation Order 1998 (S.I. 1998 No. 979)
- The Exmouth Docks Harbour Revision Order 1998 (S.I. 1998 No. 980)
- Act of Sederunt (Rules of the Court of Session Amendment No.2) (Fees of Shorthand Writers) 1998 (S.I. 1998 No. 993 (S.56)])
- The Food Safety (Fishery Products and Live Shellfish) (Hygiene) Regulations 1998 (S.I. 1998 No. 994)
- The Road Vehicles Registration Fee (Amendment) Regulations 1998 (S.I. 1998 No. 995)
- The Consumer Credit (Increase of Monetary Limits) (Amendment) Order 1998 (S.I. 1998 No. 996)
- The Consumer Credit (Further Increase of Monetary Amounts) Order 1998 (S.I. 1998 No. 997)
- The Consumer Credit (Realisation of Pawn) (Amendment) Regulations 1998 (S.I. 1998 No. 998)
- Act of Sederunt (Fees of Shorthand Writers in the Sheriff Court) (Amendment) 1998 (S.I. 1998 No. 999 (S.57)])
- The Road Vehicles (Construction and Use) (Amendment No. 2) Regulations 1998 (S.I. 1998 No. 1000)

== 1001–1100 ==
- The Financial Assistance for Environmental Purposes (No. 3) Order 1998 (S.I. 1998 No. 1001)
- The National Crime Squad Service Authority (Standing Orders) Regulations 1998 (S.I. 1998 No. 1002)
- The National Crime Squad Service Authority (Members' Interests) Regulations 1998 (S.I. 1998 No. 1003)
- The Housing Accommodation and Homelessness (Persons subject to Immigration Control) (Northern Ireland) Order 1998 (S.I. 1998 No. 1004)
- The Motor Vehicles (Type Approval) (Great Britain) (Amendment) Regulations 1998 (S.I. 1998 No. 1005)
- The Motor Vehicles (Type Approval for Goods Vehicles) (Great Britain) (Amendment) Regulations 1998 (S.I. 1998 No. 1006)
- The Antarctic (Amendment) Regulations 1998 (S.I. 1998 No. 1007)
- The Motor Vehicles (Approval) (Amendment) Regulations 1998 (S.I. 1998 No. 1008)
- The Public Entertainments Licences (Drug Misuse) Act 1997 (Commencement and Transitional Provisions) Order 1998 (S.I. 1998 No. 1009 (C.24)])
- The Firemen's Pension Scheme (Amendment) Order 1998 (S.I. 1998 No. 1010)
- The Merchant Shipping (Fire Protection: Small Ships) Regulations 1998 (S.I. 1998 No. 1011)
- The Merchant Shipping (Fire Protection: Large Ships) Regulations 1998 (S.I. 1998 No. 1012)
- The Fishing Vessels (Certification of Deck Officers and Engineer Officers) (Amendment) Regulations 1998 (S.I. 1998 No. 1013)
- The Immigration (Transit Visa) (Amendment No. 2) Order 1998 (S.I. 1998 No. 1014)
- The Channel Tunnel (Carriers' Liability) Order 1998 (S.I. 1998 No. 1015)
- The Port of Birkenhead Harbour Empowerment Order 1998 (S.I. 1998 No. 1016)
- The General Osteopathic Council (Transitional Period) (Application for Registration and Fees) Rules Order of Council 1998 (S.I. 1998 No. 1018)
- The General Osteopathic Council (Constitution and Procedure) Rules Order of Council 1998 (S.I. 1998 No. 1019)
- The General Osteopathic Council (Conditional Registration) Rules Order of Council 1998 (S.I. 1998 No. 1020)
- The Plants Breeders' Rights (Fees) Regulations 1998 (S.I. 1998 No. 1021)
- The Seeds (National Lists of Varieties) (Fees) (Amendment) Regulations 1998 (S.I. 1998 No. 1022)
- The Plant Breeders' Rights (Information Notices) (Extension to European Community Plant Variety Rights) Regulations 1998 (S.I. 1998 No. 1023)
- The Plant Breeders' Rights (Information Notices) Regulations 1998 (S.I. 1998 No. 1024)
- The Plant Breeders' Rights (Farm Saved Seed) (Specification of Species and Groups) Order 1998 (S.I. 1998 No. 1025)
- The Plant Breeders' Rights (Farm Saved Seed) (Specified Information) Regulations 1998 (S.I. 1998 No. 1026)
- The Plant Breeders' Rights Regulations 1998 (S.I. 1998 No. 1027)
- The Plant Varieties Act 1997 (Commencement) Order 1998 (S.I. 1998 No. 1028 (C.23)])
- The Road Works (Inspection Fees) (Scotland) Amendment Regulations 1998 (S.I. 1998 No. 1029 (S.58)])
- The London Cab Order 1998 (S.I. 1998 No. 1043)
- The Medicines (Exemptions for Merchants in Veterinary Drugs) Order 1998 (S.I. 1998 No. 1044)
- The Medicines (Sale or Supply) (Miscellaneous Provisions) Amendment Regulations 1998 (S.I. 1998 No. 1045)
- The Medicated Feedingstuffs Regulations 1998 (S.I. 1998 No. 1046)
- The Feedingstuffs (Zootechnical Products) Regulations 1998 (S.I. 1998 No. 1047)
- The Medicated Feedingstuffs and Feedingstuffs (Zootechnical Products) (Consequential Provisions) Regulations 1998 (S.I. 1998 No. 1048)
- The Feeding Stuffs (Establishments and Intermediaries) Regulations 1998 (S.I. 1998 No. 1049)
- The Merchant Shipping (Oil Pollution Preparedness, Response and Co-operation Convention) Regulations 1998 (S.I. 1998 No. 1056)
- The Carriage by Air Acts (Application of Provisions) (Fourth Amendment) Order 1998 (S.I. 1998 No. 1058)
- The European Communities (Definition of Treaties) (Partnership and Co-Operation Agreement between the European Communities and their Member States and Georgia) Order 1998 (S.I. 1998 No. 1059)
- The European Communities (Definition of Treaties) (Partnership and Co-operation Agreement between the European Communities and their Member States and the Republic of Armenia) Order 1998 (S.I. 1998 No. 1060)
- The European Communities (Definition of Treaties) (Partnership and Co-operation Agreement between the European Communities and their Member States and the Republic of Azerbaijan) Order 1998 (S.I. 1998 No. 1061)
- The European Communities (Definition of Treaties) (Europe Agreement establishing an Association between the European Communities and their Member States, and the Republic of Slovenia) Order 1998 (S.I. 1998 No. 1062)
- The European Communities (Definition of Treaties) (Partnership and Co-operation Agreement between the European Communities and their Member States and the Republic of Uzbekistan) Order 1998 (S.I. 1998 No. 1063)
- The Federal Republic of Yugoslavia (United Nations Sanctions) (Dependent Territories) Order 1998 (S.I. 1998 No. 1064)
- The Federal Republic of Yugoslavia (United Nations Sanctions) Order 1998 (S.I. 1998 No. 1065)
- The Hong Kong (Overseas Public Servants) (Pension Supplements) (Amendment) Order 1998 (S.I. 1998 No. 1066)
- The Merchant Shipping (Oil Pollution) (Pitcairn) (Amendment) Order 1998 (S.I. 1998 No. 1067)
- The Merchant Shipping (Oil Pollution) (Sovereign Base Areas) (Amendment) Order 1998 (S.I. 1998 No. 1068)
- The Activity Centres (Young Persons' Safety) (Northern Ireland) Order 1998 (S.I. 1998 No. 1069 (N.I. 5)])
- The Asylum and Immigration Act 1996 (Jersey) Order 1998 (S.I. 1998 No. 1070)
- The Family Homes and Domestic Violence (Northern Ireland) Order 1998 (S.I. 1998 No. 1071 (N.I. 6)])
- The Federal Republic of Yugoslavia (United Nations Sanctions) (Channel Islands) Order 1998 (S.I. 1998 No. 1072)
- The Federal Republic of Yugoslavia (United Nations Sanctions) (Isle of Man) Order 1998 (S.I. 1998 No. 1073)
- The Road Traffic (New Drivers) (Northern Ireland) Order 1998 (S.I. 1998 No. 1074 (N.I. 7)])
- The United Nations Personnel (Guernsey) Order 1998 (S.I. 1998 No. 1075)
- The Institute of Legal Executives Order 1998 (S.I. 1998 No. 1077)
- The Education (Inspectors of Schools in Wales) Order 1998 (S.I. 1998 No. 1078)
- The Local Government Finance (Scotland) Order 1998 (S.I. 1998 No. 1082 (S.59)])
- The Revenue Support Grant (Scotland) Order 1998 (S.I. 1998 No. 1083 (S.60))

== 1101–1200 ==
- The Nurses, Midwives and Health Visitors (Professional Conduct) (Amendment) Rules 1998 Approval Order 1998 (S.I. 1998 No. 1103)
- The Special Trustees for the Middlesex Hospital (Transfer of Trust Property) Order 1998 (S.I. 1998 No. 1104)
- The A41 Trunk Road (Camden) Red Route Traffic Order 1998 (S.I. 1998 No. 1105)
- The A205 Trunk Road (Lewisham) Red Route (Cycle Lane) Traffic Order 1998 (S.I. 1998 No. 1106)
- The London Borough of Haringey (A10 Trunk Road) Red Route (Bus Lanes) Traffic Order 1998 (S.I. 1998 No. 1107)
- The Housing Renewal Grants (Prescribed Form and Particulars) (Welsh Form and Particulars) Regulations 1998 (S.I. 1998 No. 1113)
- The A420 Trunk Road (Majors Road Junction) Order 1998 (S.I. 1998 No. 1114)
- The Bank of England Act 1998 (Commencement) Order 1998 (S.I. 1998 No. 1120 (C.25)])
- The Plant Health (Great Britain) (Amendment) (No. 2) Order 1998 (S.I. 1998 No. 1121)
- The A205 Trunk Road (Lambeth) Red Route (Prescribed Routes and Prohibited Turns) Traffic Order 1998 (S.I. 1998 No. 1122)
- The Local Authorities (Goods and Services) (Public Bodies) (No. 3) Order 1998 (S.I. 1998 No. 1123)
- The Newport–Shrewsbury Trunk Road A4042 (Croes-y-Mwyalch Roundabout to Woodlands Roundabout) De-Trunking Order 1998 (S.I. 1998 No. 1124)
- The A205 Trunk Road (Wandsworth) Red Route (Clearway) Traffic Order 1998 (S.I. 1998 No. 1125)
- Northern Ireland Negotiations (Referendum) Order 1998 (S.I. 1998 No. 1126)
- Northern Ireland (Entry to Negotiations, etc.) Act 1996 (Cessation of Section 3) Order 1998 (S.I. 1998 No. 1127)
- The Income Support (General) (Standard Interest Rate Amendment) Regulations 1998 (S.I. 1998 No. 1128)
- The Bank of England Act 1998 (Consequential Amendments of Subordinate Legislation) Order 1998 (S.I. 1998 No. 1129)
- The Cash Ratio Deposits (Eligible Liabilities) Order 1998 (S.I. 1998 No. 1130)
- The Apple and Pear Orchard Grubbing Up Regulations 1998 (S.I. 1998 No. 1131)
- The Road Traffic (Special Parking Area) (London Borough of Sutton) Order 1998 (S.I. 1998 No. 1134)
- The Bovines and Bovine Products (Trade) Regulations 1998 (S.I. 1998 No. 1135)
- The National Health Service (Pilot Schemes—Health Service Bodies) Amendment Regulations 1998 (S.I. 1998 No. 1136)
- The Social Security Revaluation of Earnings Factors Order 1998 (S.I. 1998 No. 1137)
- The Osteopaths Act 1993 (Commencement No. 3) Order 1998 (S.I. 1998 No. 1138 (C.26)])
- The Penrhos Point Mussel Fishery Order 1998 (S.I. 1998 No. 1146)
- The Academic Awards and Distinctions (Queen Margaret College) (Scotland) Order of Council 1998 (S.I. 1998 No. 1148 (S.61)])
- The International Development Association (Eleventh Replenishment) Order 1998 (S.I. 1998 No. 1149)
- The A3 Trunk Road (Wandsworth) Red Route (Clearway) Traffic Order 1998 (S.I. 1998 No. 1150)
- The London Borough of Wandsworth (Trunk Roads) Red Route (Bus Lanes) Traffic Order 1998 (S.I. 1998 No. 1151)
- The Aviation Security (Air Cargo Agents) (Amendment) Regulations 1998 (S.I. 1998 No. 1152)
- The Merchant Shipping (Dangerous or Noxious Liquid Substances in Bulk) (Amendment) Regulations 1998 (S.I. 1998 No. 1153)
- The Packaging (Essential Requirements) Regulations 1998 (S.I. 1998 No. 1165)
- The Education (Mandatory Awards) Regulations 1998 (S.I. 1998 No. 1166)
- The Textile Products (Indications of Fibre Content) (Amendment) Regulations 1998 (S.I. 1998 No. 1169)
- The Coventry Healthcare National Health Service Trust (Establishment) Amendment Order 1998 (S.I. 1998 No. 1170)
- The Bromley Hospitals National Health Service Trust (Establishment) Amendment Order 1998 (S.I. 1998 No. 1171)
- The Rotherham Priority Health Services National Health Service Trust (Establishment) Amendment Order 1998 (S.I. 1998 No. 1172)
- The Social Security (Miscellaneous Amendments) (No.3) Regulations 1998 (S.I. 1998 No. 1173)
- The Social Security (Miscellaneous Amendments) (No. 4) Regulations 1998 (S.I. 1998 No. 1174)
- The Magistrates' Courts Committees (Merseyside) Amalgamation Order 1998 (S.I. 1998 No. 1175)
- The Magistrates' Courts Committees (West Midlands) Amalgamation Order 1998 (S.I. 1998 No. 1176)
- The Measuring Instruments (EEC Requirements) (Fees) Regulations 1998 (S.I. 1998 No. 1177)
- The Prescription Only Medicines (Human Use) Amendment (No. 2) Order 1998 (S.I. 1998 No. 1178)
- The Special Trustees for the Royal Hospital of St. Bartholomew (Transfer of Trust Property) Order 1998 (S.I. 1998 No. 1186)
- The Black Country Mental Health National Health Service Trust (Establishment) Amendment Order 1998 (S.I. 1998 No. 1187)
- The Road Vehicles (Construction and Use) (Amendment) (No. 3) Regulations 1998 (S.I. 1998 No. 1188)
- The Mental Health Review Tribunal (Amendment) Rules 1998 (S.I. 1998 No. 1189)
- The Local Land Charges (Amendment) Rules 1998 (S.I. 1998 No. 1190)
- The Legal Aid in Criminal and Care Proceedings (Costs) (Amendment) Regulations 1998 (S.I. 1998 No. 1191)
- The Local Government Act 1988 (Defined Activities) (Exemptions) (London Boroughs of Hillingdon and Hounslow, and Daventry and Horsham District Councils) Order 1998 (S.I. 1998 No. 1193)
- The Teacher Training Agency (Additional Functions) Order 1998 (S.I. 1998 No. 1194)
- The Cod (Specified Sea Areas) (Prohibition of Fishing) Order 1998 (S.I. 1998 No. 1195)
- The Town and Country Planning (Use Classes) (Scotland) Amendment Order 1998 (S.I. 1998 No. 1196 (S. 62)])
- The Insurance Companies (Loan Relationships) (Election for Accruals Basis) Order 1998 (S.I. 1998 No. 1200)

== 1201–1300 ==
- The Pensions Appeal Tribunals (England and Wales) (Amendment) Rules 1998 (S.I. 1998 No. 1201)
- The Action Programme for Nitrate Vulnerable Zones (England and Wales) Regulations 1998 (S.I. 1998 No. 1202)
- The Consumer Credit Licensing (Appeals) Regulations 1998 (S.I. 1998 No. 1203)
- The A65 Trunk Road (Manor Park Improvement) Order 1993 (Revocation) Order 1998 (S.I. 1998 No. 1206)
- The A65 Trunk Road (Denton Bridge to Black Bull Farm) (Detrunking) Order 1993 (Revocation) Order 1998 (S.I. 1998 No. 1207)
- The Package Travel, Package Holidays and Package Tours (Amendment) Regulations 1998 (S.I. 1998 No. 1208)
- The Bristol City Docks Harbour Revision Order 1998 (S.I. 1998 No. 1209)
- The Sussex Sea Fisheries District (Constitution of Committee and Expenses) (Variation) Order 1998 (S.I. 1998 No. 1210)
- The Devon Sea Fisheries District (Variation) Order 1998 (S.I. 1998 No. 1211)
- The Kent and Essex Sea Fisheries District (Variation) Order 1998 (S.I. 1998 No. 1212)
- The Cumbria Ambulance Service National Health Service Trust (Establishment) Amendment Order 1998 (S.I. 1998 No. 1213)
- The Peterhead Harbours Revision Order 1998 (S.I. 1998 No. 1215 (S. 63)])
- The Education (Grants to Aided and Special Agreement Schools) Regulations 1998 (S.I. 1998 No. 1216)
- The Vehicle Excise Duty (Immobilisation, Removal and Disposal of Vehicles) (Amendment) Regulations 1998 (S.I. 1998 No. 1217)
- The Public Lending Right Scheme 1982 (Commencement of Variations) Order 1998 (S.I. 1998 No. 1218)
- The Judicial Pensions (Contributions) Regulations 1998 (S.I. 1998 No. 1219)
- The Education (Individual Performance Information) (Prescribed Bodies and Persons) (Wales) Regulations 1998 (S.I. 1998 No. 1220)
- Scrabster (Forward Supply Base) Harbour Revision Order 1998 (S.I. 1998 No. 1221 (S. 64)])
- The Education (Partnership Grant) Regulations 1998 (S.I. 1998 No. 1222)
- The A1089 and the A126 Trunk Roads (Tilbury) (Detrunking) Order 1998 (S.I. 1998 No. 1223)
- The Offshore Installations (Safety Zones) (No. 2) Order 1998 (S.I. 1998 No. 1224)
- The Pensions Appeal Tribunals (Scotland) (Amendment) Rules 1998 (S.I. 1998 No. 1225 (S.65)])
- The Town and Country Planning (General Permitted Development) (Scotland) Amendment Order 1998 (S.I. 1998 No. 1226 (S.66)])
- The Oxford Radcliffe Hospital National Health Service Trust (Change of Name) Order 1998 (S.I. 1998 No. 1227)
- The Seed Potatoes (Fees) Regulations 1998 (S.I. 1998 No. 1228)
- The Motor Vehicles (Driving Licences) (Amendment) (No. 3) Regulations 1998 (S.I. 1998 No. 1229)
- The Local Government Act 1988 (Defined Activities) (Exemptions) (Northumberland County Council and Suffolk Coastal District Council) Order 1998 (S.I. 1998 No. 1237)
- The Local Government Pension Scheme Regulations 1997 (Amendment) Regulations 1998 (S.I. 1998 No. 1238)
- The Education (London Residuary Body) (Property Transfer) (Modification) Order 1998 (S.I. 1998 No. 1239)
- The Broadcasting (Local Delivery Services) Order 1998 (S.I. 1998 No. 1240)
- The Hovercraft (Application of Enactments)(Amendment) Order 1998 (S.I. 1998 No. 1256)
- The Hovercraft (Convention on Limitation of Liability for Maritime Claims (Amendment)) Order 1998 (S.I. 1998 No. 1257)
- The Merchant Shipping (Convention on Limitation of Liability for Maritime Claims) (Amendment) Order 1998 (S.I. 1998 No. 1258)
- The European Communities (Enforcement of Community Judgments) (Amendment) Order 1998 (S.I. 1998 No. 1259)
- The Turks and Caicos Islands (Territorial Sea) (Amendment) Order 1998 (S.I. 1998 No. 1260)
- The Merchant Shipping (Oil Pollution) (Cayman Islands) Order 1998 (S.I. 1998 No. 1261)
- The Merchant Shipping (Oil Pollution) (Montserrat) Order 1998 (S.I. 1998 No. 1262)
- The Merchant Shipping (Oil Pollution) (Saint Helena) Order 1998 (S.I. 1998 No. 1263)
- The Asylum and Immigration Act 1996 (Guernsey) Order 1998 (S.I. 1998 No. 1264)
- The Employment Rights (Dispute Resolution) (Northern Ireland) Order 1998 (S.I. 1998 No. 1265 (N.I. 8)])
- The Football Spectators (Corresponding Offences in France) Order 1998 (S.I. 1998 No. 1266)
- The United Nations Personnel (Jersey) Order 1998 (S.I. 1998 No. 1267)
- The Visiting Forces (Designation) Order 1998 (S.I. 1998 No. 1268)
- The Cash Ratio Deposits (Value Bands and Ratios) Order 1998 (S.I. 1998 No. 1269)
- The Bank of England (Information Powers) Order 1998 (S.I. 1998 No. 1270)
- The Restriction on Agreements and Conduct (Specified Domestic Electrical Goods) Order 1998 (S.I. 1998 No. 1271)
- The Yorkshire Ouse (Pilotage Powers) Order 1998 (S.I. 1998 No. 1272)
- The A3 Trunk Road (Kingston upon Thames, Merton and Elmbridge) (50 m.p.h. Speed Limit) Order 1998 (S.I. 1998 No. 1273)
- The Social Security Amendment (New Deal) Regulations 1998 (S.I. 1998 No. 1274)
- The Right to Purchase (Prescribed Persons) (Scotland) Amendment Order 1998 (S.I. 1998 No. 1275 (S.67)])
- The Razor Shells, Trough Shells and Carpet Shells (Specified Sea Area) (Prohibition of Fishing) Order 1998 (S.I. 1998 No. 1276)
- The Food (Cheese) (Emergency Control) Order 1998 (S.I. 1998 No. 1277)
- The A23 Trunk Road (Croydon) Red Route (Prohibited Turns) Traffic Order 1998 (S.I. 1998 No. 1278)
- The Enfield Community Care National Health Service Trust (Establishment) Amendment Order 1998 (S.I. 1998 No. 1280)
- The Road Vehicles (Construction and Use) (Amendment) (No. 4) Regulations 1998 (S.I. 1998 No. 1281)
- The Disability Discrimination Act 1995 (Commencement No. 5) Order 1998 (S.I. 1998 No. 1282 (C.27)])
- The Food (Cheese) (Emergency Control) (Amendment) Order 1998 (S.I. 1998 No. 1284)
- The Oxfordshire Mental Healthcare National Health Service Trust (Establishment) Amendment Order 1998 (S.I. 1998 No. 1285)
- The Northern Ireland Referendum (Counting Officer's Charges) Order 1998 (S.I. 1998 No. 1286)
- The New Northern Ireland Assembly (Elections) Order 1998 (S.I. 1998 No. 1287)
- The Magistrates' Courts Committees (Merseyside) Amalgamation (Amendment) Order 1998 (S.I. 1998 No. 1293)
- The Value Added Tax (Osteopaths) Order 1998 (S.I. 1998 No. 1294)
- The Environmentally Sensitive Areas (England) Designation Orders (Revocation of Specified Provisions) Regulations 1998 (S.I. 1998 No. 1295)
- The Environmentally Sensitive Areas (West Penwith) Designation (Amendment) Order 1998 (S.I. 1998 No. 1296)
- The Environmentally Sensitive Areas (South Downs) Designation (Amendment) Order 1998 (S.I. 1998 No. 1297)
- The Environmentally Sensitive Areas (Somerset Levels and Moors) Designation (Amendment) Order 1998 (S.I. 1998 No. 1298)
- The Environmentally Sensitive Areas (The Broads) Designation (Amendment) Order 1998 (S.I. 1998 No. 1299)
- The Environmentally Sensitive Areas (Pennine Dales) Designation (Amendment) Order 1998 (S.I. 1998 No. 1300)

== 1301–1400 ==
- The Environmentally Sensitive Areas (Lake District) Designation (Amendment) Order 1998 (S.I. 1998 No. 1301)
- The Environmentally Sensitive Areas (Exmoor) Designation (Amendment) Order 1998 (S.I. 1998 No. 1302)
- The Environmentally Sensitive Areas (North Peak) Designation (Amendment) Order 1998 (S.I. 1998 No. 1303)
- The Environmentally Sensitive Areas (North Kent Marshes) Designation (Amendment) Order 1998 (S.I. 1998 No. 1304)
- The Environmentally Sensitive Areas (South West Peak) Designation (Amendment) Order 1998 (S.I. 1998 No. 1305)
- The Environmentally Sensitive Areas (Breckland) Designation (Amendment) Order 1998 (S.I. 1998 No. 1306)
- The Environmentally Sensitive Areas (Avon Valley) Designation (Amendment) Order 1998 (S.I. 1998 No. 1307)
- The Environmentally Sensitive Areas (Test Valley) Designation (Amendment) Order 1998 (S.I. 1998 No. 1308)
- The Environmentally Sensitive Areas (South Wessex Downs) Designation (Amendment) Order 1998 (S.I. 1998 No. 1309)
- The Environmentally Sensitive Areas (Suffolk River Valleys) Designation (Amendment) Order 1998 (S.I. 1998 No. 1310)
- The Environmentally Sensitive Areas (Clun) Designation (Amendment)Order 1998 (S.I. 1998 No. 1311)
- Strathspey Light Railway Order 1998 (S.I. 1998 No. 1312)
- The Northern Ireland (Elections) Act 1998 (Commencement) Order 1998 (S.I. 1998 No. 1313 (C. 29)])
- The Home-Grown Cereals Authority (Rate of Levy) Order 1998 (S.I. 1998 No. 1314)
- The Retirement Benefits Schemes (Restriction on Discretion to Approve) (Small Self-administered Schemes) (Amendment No. 2) Regulations 1998 (S.I. 1998 No. 1315)
- The Broadcasting (Percentage of Digital Capacity for Radio Multiplex Licence) Order 1998 (S.I. 1998 No. 1326)
- The Countryside Stewardship Regulations 1998 (S.I. 1998 No. 1327)
- The General Osteopathic Council (Registration) Rules Order of Council 1998 (S.I. 1998 No. 1328)
- The General Osteopathic Council (Professional Indemnity Insurance) Rules Order of Council 1998 (S.I. 1998 No. 1329)
- The National Health Service (Pilot Schemes: Financial Assistance for Preparatory Work) Regulations 1998 (S.I. 1998 No. 1330)
- The Bolton Sixth Form College (Incorporation) Order 1998 (S.I. 1998 No. 1331)
- The Bolton Sixth Form College (Government) Regulations 1998 (S.I. 1998 No. 1332)
- The Special Immigration Appeals Commission Act 1997 (Commencement No. 1) Order 1998 (S.I. 1998 No. 1336 (C. 28)])
- The General Optical Council (Disciplinary Committee (Procedure) (Amendment) Rules) Order of Council 1998 (S.I. 1998 No. 1337)
- The General Optical Council (Disciplinary Committee (Constitution) Rules) Order of Council 1998 (S.I. 1998 No. 1338)
- The Local Government Changes for England (Disability Statements) Regulations 1998 (S.I. 1998 No. 1339)
- The Railways Regulations 1998 (S.I. 1998 No. 1340)
- The Queen Mary's Sidcup National Health Service Trust (Establishment) Amendment Order 1998 (S.I. 1998 No. 1341)
- The Food Protection (Emergency Prohibitions) (Paralytic Shellfish Poisoning) Order 1998 (S.I. 1998 No. 1342)
- The Secure Training Centres (Escorts) (Amendment) Rules 1998 (S.I. 1998 No. 1343)
- The Surface Waters (Dangerous Substances) (Classification) (Scotland) (No.2) Regulations 1998 (S.I. 1998 No. 1344 (S.68)])
- The Enforcement of Road Traffic Debts (Certificated Bailiffs) (Amendment) Regulations 1998 (S.I. 1998 No. 1351 (L.1)])
- The Control of Substances Hazardous to Health (Amendment) Regulations 1998 (S.I. 1998 No. 1357)
- The Fisheries and Aquaculture Structure (Grants) Amendment Regulations 1998 (S.I. 1998 No. 1365 (S.69)])
- The Value Added Tax (Reduced Rate) Order 1998 (S.I. 1998 No. 1375)
- The Plastic Materials and Articles in Contact with Food Regulations 1998 (S.I. 1998 No. 1376)
- The Merchant Shipping (Prevention of Pollution by Garbage) Regulations 1998 (S.I. 1998 No. 1377)
- The Social Security (Student Amounts Amendment) Regulations 1998 (S.I. 1998 No. 1379)
- The Local Government Act 1988 (Defined Activities) (Exemptions) (Combined Fire Authorities Etc.) Order 1998 (S.I. 1998 No. 1380)
- The Social Security (Claims and Payments) Amendment Regulations 1998 (S.I. 1998 No. 1381)
- The Restrictive Trade Practices (Standards) (Services) Order 1998 (S.I. 1998 No. 1394)
- The Restrictive Trade Practices (Standards) (Goods) Order 1998 (S.I. 1998 No. 1395)
- The Seeds (Fees) (Amendment) Regulations 1998 (S.I. 1998 No. 1396)
- The Occupational Pension Schemes (Contracting-out) (Amount Required for Restoring State Scheme Rights and Miscellaneous Amendment) Regulations 1998 (S.I. 1998 No. 1397)
- The Food Labelling (Amendment) Regulations 1998 (S.I. 1998 No. 1398)

== 1401–1500 ==
- The Greenwich Healthcare National Health Service Trust (Establishment) Amendment Order 1998 (S.I. 1998 No. 1417)
- The Merchant Shipping (Navigation Bridge Visibility) Regulations 1998 (S.I. 1998 No. 1419)
- The Driving Licences (Community Driving Licence) Regulations 1998 (S.I. 1998 No. 1420)
- The Local Government (Exemption from Competition) (Scotland) Amendment Order 1998 (S.I. 1998 No. 1421 (S.70)])
- The Local Government Act 1988 (Competition) (Scotland) Amendment Regulations 1998 (S.I. 1998 No. 1422 (S.71)])
- The Local Government Act 1988 (Exemption for Works Contracts) (Scotland) Order 1998 (S.I. 1998 No. 1423 (S.72)])
- The National Health Service (Service Committees and Tribunal) (Scotland) Amendment (No.2) Regulations 1998 (S.I. 1998 No. 1424 (S.73)])
- The New Deal (Miscellaneous Provisions) (Amendment) Order 1998 (S.I. 1998 No. 1425)
- The Training for Work (Miscellaneous Provisions) (Amendment) Order 1998 (S.I. 1998 No. 1426)
- The Human Organ Transplants (Establishment of Relationship) Regulations 1998 (S.I. 1998 No. 1428)
- The Inheritance Tax (Delivery of Accounts) (Northern Ireland) Regulations 1998 (S.I. 1998 No. 1429)
- The Inheritance Tax (Delivery of Accounts) (Scotland) Regulations 1998 (S.I. 1998 No. 1430)
- The Inheritance Tax (Delivery of Accounts) Regulations 1998 (S.I. 1998 No. 1431)
- The Magistrates' Courts Committees (Devon and Cornwall) Amalgamation Order 1998 (S.I. 1998 No. 1432)
- The Merchant Shipping (Port State Control) (Amendment) Regulations 1998 (S.I. 1998 No. 1433)
- The Local Government Act 1988 (Defined Activities) (Exemption) (Walsall Metropolitan Borough Council) Order 1998 (S.I. 1998 No. 1434)
- The Channel Tunnel Rail Link (Qualifying Authorities) Order 1998 (S.I. 1998 No. 1445)
- The National Savings Stock Register (Closure of Register to Gilts) Order 1998 (S.I. 1998 No. 1446)
- The Environmental Information (Amendment) Regulations 1998 (S.I. 1998 No. 1447)
- The Road Humps (Scotland) Regulations 1998 (S.I. 1998 No. 1448 (S.74)])
- The Contracting Out (Functions Relating to National Savings) Order 1998 (S.I. 1998 No. 1449)
- The Treasury Bills (Amendment) Regulations 1998 (S.I. 1998 No. 1450)
- The National Health Service Superannuation Scheme (Scotland) (Additional Voluntary Contributions) Regulations 1998 (S.I. 1998 No. 1451 (S.75)])
- The National Health Service Trusts (Membership and Procedure) (Scotland) Amendment Regulations 1998 (S.I. 1998 No. 1458 (S.76)])
- The Health Boards (Membership and Procedure) (No.2) Amendment Regulations 1998 (S.I. 1998 No. 1459 (S.77)])
- The Mental Health Review Tribunals (Regions) Order 1998 (S.I. 1998 No. 1460)
- The Air Passenger Duty and Other Indirect Taxes (Interest Rate) Regulations 1998 (S.I. 1998 No. 1461)
- The A205 Trunk Road (Wandsworth and Richmond) Red Route Traffic Order 1998 (S.I. 1998 No. 1462)
- The Occupational Pension Schemes (Modification of the Pension Schemes Act 1993) Regulations 1998 (S.I. 1998 No. 1466)
- The Council Tax Limitation (Derbyshire County Council) (Maximum Amount) Order 1998 (S.I. 1998 No. 1468)
- The Electrical Equipment for Explosive Atmospheres (Certification) (Amendment) (No. 2) Regulations 1998 (S.I. 1998 No. 1469)
- The Education (Grants for Education Support and Training) (Wales) (Amendment) Regulations 1998 (S.I. 1998 No. 1489)
- The Magistrates' Courts Committees (Thames Valley) Amalgamation Order 1998 (S.I. 1998 No. 1492)
- The New Northern Ireland Assembly Elections (Returning Officer's Charges) Order 1998 (S.I. 1998 No. 1493)
- The Occupational Pension Schemes (Scheme Administration) Amendment Regulations 1998 (S.I. 1998 No. 1494)
- The Education (Assisted Places) (Scotland) Amendment Regulations 1998 (S.I. 1998 No. 1497 (S.78)])
- The St Mary's Music School (Aided Places) Amendment Regulations 1998 (S.I. 1998 No. 1498 (S.79)])
- The Army, Air Force and Naval Discipline Acts (Continuation) Order 1998 (S.I. 1998 No. 1499)
- The Merchant Shipping (Control of Pollution) (SOLAS) Order 1998 (S.I. 1998 No. 1500)

== 1501–1600 ==
- The United Nations Arms Embargoes (Amendment) (Sierra Leone) Order 1998 (S.I. 1998 No. 1501)
- The United Nations Arms Embargoes (Dependent Territories) (Amendment) (Sierra Leone) Order 1998 (S.I. 1998 No. 1502)
- The Civil Aviation (Investigation of Air Accidents and Incidents) (Guernsey) Order 1998 (S.I. 1998 No. 1503)
- The Criminal Justice (Children) (Northern Ireland) Order 1998 (S.I. 1998 No. 1504 (N.I. 9)])
- The Geneva Conventions (Amendment) Act 1995 (Commencement) Order 1998 (S.I. 1998 No. 1505 (C.30)])
- The Social Security (Northern Ireland) Order 1998 (S.I. 1998 No. 1506 (N.I. 10)])
- The United Nations Arms Embargoes (Channel Islands) (Amendment) (Sierra Leone) Order 1998 (S.I. 1998 No. 1507)
- The United Nations Arms Embargoes (Isle of Man) (Amendment) (Sierra Leone) Order 1998 (S.I. 1998 No. 1508)
- The United Nations Personnel (Isle of Man) Order 1998 (S.I. 1998 No. 1509)
- The Wireless Telegraphy (Isle of Man) Order 1998 (S.I. 1998 No. 1510)
- The Wireless Telegraphy (Guernsey) Order 1998 (S.I. 1998 No. 1511)
- The Wireless Telegraphy (Jersey) Order 1998 (S.I. 1998 No. 1512)
- The Visiting Forces and Allied Headquarters (Income Tax and Capital Gains Tax) (Designation) Order 1998 (S.I. 1998 No. 1513)
- The Visiting Forces (Income Tax and Capital Gains Tax) (Designation) Order 1998 (S.I. 1998 No. 1514)
- The Visiting Forces and Allied Headquarters (Inheritance Tax) (Designation) Order 1998 (S.I. 1998 No. 1515)
- The Visiting Forces (Inheritance Tax) (Designation) Order 1998 (S.I. 1998 No. 1516)
- The Visiting Forces and Allied Headquarters (Stamp Duties) (Designation) Order 1998 (S.I. 1998 No. 1517)
- The Visiting Forces (Stamp Duties) (Designation) Order 1998 (S.I. 1998 No. 1518)
- The Railways (Amendment) Regulations 1998 (S.I. 1998 No. 1519)
- The Local Government Act 1988 (Defined Activities) (Exemptions) (London Fire and Civil Defence Authority) Order 1998 (S.I. 1998 No. 1528)
- The Deregulation (Deduction from Pay of Union Subscriptions) Order 1998 (S.I. 1998 No. 1529)
- The Export of Goods (Federal Republic of Yugoslavia) (Control) Order 1998 (S.I. 1998 No. 1530)
- The Federal Republic of Yugoslavia (Supply and Sale of Equipment) (Penalties and Licences) Regulations 1998 (S.I. 1998 No. 1531)
- The Education (School Performance Targets) (England) Regulations 1998 (S.I. 1998 No. 1532)
- The Loughborough College of Art and Design Higher Education Corporation (Dissolution) Order 1998 (S.I. 1998 No. 1533)
- The Civil Aviation (Route Charges for Navigation Services) (Amendment) Regulations 1998 (S.I. 1998 No. 1537)
- The Road Traffic (Permitted Parking Area and Special Parking Area) (City of Edinburgh) Designation Order 1998 (S.I. 1998 No. 1539 (S.80)])
- The Social Security Amendment (Personal Allowances for Children) Regulations 1998 (S.I. 1998 No. 1541)
- The Police (Health and Safety) Act 1997 (Commencement) Order 1998 (S.I. 1998 No. 1542 (C.31)])
- The Bradford Community Health National Health Service Trust (Establishment) Amendment Order 1998 (S.I. 1998 No. 1543)
- The Prison (Amendment) (No. 2) Rules 1998 (S.I. 1998 No. 1544)
- The Young Offender Institution (Amendment) Rules 1998 (S.I. 1998 No. 1545)
- The Dentists Act 1984 (Amendment) Order 1998 (S.I. 1998 No. 1546)
- The Electricity (Standards of Performance) (Amendment) Regulations 1998 (S.I. 1998 No. 1547)
- The Genetically Modified Organisms (Contained Use) (Amendment) Regulations 1998 (S.I. 1998 No. 1548)
- The Fire Services (Amendment) (Northern Ireland) Order 1998 (S.I. 1998 No. 1549 (N.I. 11)])
- The Financial Services (Designated Countries and Territories) (Overseas Insurance Companies) Order 1998 (S.I. 1998 No. 1550)
- The Education (Baseline Assessment) (England) Regulations 1998 (S.I. 1998 No. 1551)
- The Merchant Shipping (International Safety Management (ISM) Code) Regulations 1998 (S.I. 1998 No. 1561)
- The Local Government Reorganisation (Wales) (Repeal of Enactments) Order 1998 (S.I. 1998 No. 1562)
- The Road Vehicles (Construction and Use) (Amendment) (No. 5) Regulations 1998 (S.I. 1998 No. 1563)
- The A3 Trunk Road (Wandsworth) (Temporary Prohibition of Traffic) Order 1998 (S.I. 1998 No. 1564)
- The Meters (Approval of Pattern or Construction and Manner of Installation) Regulations 1998 (S.I. 1998 No. 1565)
- The Meters (Certification) Regulations 1998 (S.I. 1998 No. 1566)
- The Wireless Telegraphy (Licence Charges) (Amendment No. 2) Regulations 1998 (S.I. 1998 No. 1567)
- The Mines (Notification of Abandonment) (Scotland) Regulations 1998 (S.I. 1998 No. 1572 (S.81)])
- The Local Authorities (Goods and Services) (Public Bodies) (No. 4) Order 1998 (S.I. 1998 No. 1574)
- The Special Health Authorities (Amendment) Regulations 1998 (S.I. 1998 No. 1576)
- The Special Health Authorities (Establishment and Constitution Orders) Amendment Order 1998 (S.I. 1998 No. 1577)
- The Homelessness (Decisions on Referrals) Order 1998 (S.I. 1998 No. 1578)
- The Telecommunications (Open Network Provision) (Voice Telephony) Regulations 1998 (S.I. 1998 No. 1580)
- The Child Benefit and Social Security (Fixing and Adjustment of Rates) (Amendment) Regulations 1998 (S.I. 1998 No. 1581)
- The Food Protection (Emergency Prohibitions) (Paralytic Shellfish Poisoning) (No.2) Order 1998 (S.I. 1998 No. 1582)
- The Education (Grants) (Music, Ballet and Choir Schools) (Amendment) Regulations 1998 (S.I. 1998 No. 1583)
- The Education (Teachers) (Amendment) Regulations 1998 (S.I. 1998 No. 1584)
- The Education (Assisted Places) (Incidental Expenses) (Amendment) Regulations 1998 (S.I. 1998 No. 1585)
- The Local Government Act 1988 (Defined Activities) (Exemptions) (Dacorum, Hertsmere and Luton Borough Councils) Order 1998 (S.I. 1998 No. 1586)
- The Vaccine Damage Payments Act 1979 Statutory Sum Order 1998 (S.I. 1998 No. 1587)
- The M3 Motorway (Minley Interchange Connecting Roads) Scheme 1998 (S.I. 1998 No. 1588)
- The Prisons and Young Offenders Institutions (Scotland) Amendment Rules 1998 (S.I. 1998 No. 1589 (S.82)])
- The National Health Service Superannuation Scheme (Scotland) Amendment Regulations 1998 (S.I. 1998 No. 1593 (S. 83)])
- The National Health Service (Scotland) (Injury Benefits) Regulations 1998 (S.I. 1998 No. 1594 (S. 84)])
- The New Opportunities Fund (Specification of Initiatives) Order 1998 (S.I. 1998 No. 1598)
- The Football Spectators (Seating) Order 1998 (S.I. 1998 No. 1599)
- The National Health Service (General Medical Services) (Scotland) Amendment (No.3) Regulations 1998 (S.I. 1998 No. 1600 (S.85))

== 1601–1700 ==
- The Safety of Sports Grounds (Designation) (Scotland) Order 1998 (S.I. 1998 No. 1601 (S.86)])
- The Deregulation (Methylated Spirits Sale by Retail) (Scotland) Order 1998 (S.I. 1998 No. 1602 (S.87)])
- The Homelessness (Decisions on Referrals) (Scotland) Order 1998 (S.I. 1998 No. 1603 (S.88)])
- The Swansea Bay Port Health Authority (Amendment) Order 1998 (S.I. 1998 No. 1604)
- The Organic Farming (Aid) (Amendment) Regulations 1998 (S.I. 1998 No. 1606)
- The Education (Start of Compulsory School Age) Order 1998 (S.I. 1998 No. 1607)
- The North Bolton Sixth Form College and South College, Bolton (Dissolution) Order 1998 (S.I. 1998 No. 1608)
- The Merchant Shipping (Small Workboats and Pilot Boats) Regulations 1998 (S.I. 1998 No. 1609)
- The Anglian Regional Flood Defence Committee Order 1998 (S.I. 1998 No. 1636)
- The North West Regional Flood Defence Committee Order 1998 (S.I. 1998 No. 1637)
- The Severn-Trent Regional Flood Defence Committee Order 1998 (S.I. 1998 No. 1638)
- The Southern Regional Flood Defence Committee Order 1998 (S.I. 1998 No. 1639)
- The South West Regional Flood Defence Committee Order 1998 (S.I. 1998 No. 1640)
- The Thames Regional Flood Defence Committee Order 1998 (S.I. 1998 No. 1641)
- The A4 Trunk Road (Hounslow) Red Route (Clearway) Traffic Order 1996 Variation Order 1998 (S.I. 1998 No. 1642)
- The Federal Republic of Yugoslavia and Serbia (Freezing of Funds) Regulations 1998 (S.I. 1998 No. 1643)
- The Moray House Institute of Education (Closure) (Scotland) Order 1998 (S.I. 1998 No. 1644 (S. 89)])
- The Sheep and Goats Spongiform EncephalopathyOrder 1998 (S.I. 1998 No. 1645)
- The Sheep and Goats Spongiform Encephalopathy Regulations 1998 (S.I. 1998 No. 1646)
- The Sheep and Goats Spongiform Encephalopathy (Compensation) Order 1998 (S.I. 1998 No. 1647)
- The National Health Service (General Dental Services) Amendment Regulations 1998 (S.I. 1998 No. 1648)
- The Control of Pollution (Channel Tunnel Rail Link) Regulations 1998 (S.I. 1998 No. 1649)
- The Protection of Wrecks (Designation No. 1) Order 1998 (S.I. 1998 No. 1650)
- The Cambridgeshire College of Agriculture and Horticulture (Dissolution) Order 1998 (S.I. 1998 No. 1651)
- The Newton Rigg College, Penrith (Dissolution) Order 1998 (S.I. 1998 No. 1652)
- The High Peak College, Buxton (Dissolution) Order 1998 (S.I. 1998 No. 1653)
- The Airedale and Wharfedale College (Dissolution) Order 1998 (S.I. 1998 No. 1654)
- The Basford Hall College, Nottingham (Dissolution) Order 1998 (S.I. 1998 No. 1655)
- The East Birmingham College (Dissolution) Order 1998 (S.I. 1998 No. 1656)
- The Harrogate College (Dissolution) Order 1998 (S.I. 1998 No. 1657)
- The Employment Rights (Dispute Resolution) Act 1998 (Commencement No. 1 and Transitional and Saving Provisions) Order 1998 (S.I. 1998 No. 1658 (C.32)])
- The Sports Grounds and Sporting Events (Designation) (Scotland) Amendment Order 1998 (S.I. 1998 No. 1659 (S. 90)])
- The Offshore Installations (Safety Zones) (No. 3) Order 1998 (S.I. 1998 No. 1660)
- The Local Government Act 1988 (Defined Activities) (Exemption) (Bournemouth Borough Council and North West Leicestershire District Council) Order 1998 (S.I. 1998 No. 1661)
- The National Health Service (General Dental Services) (Scotland) Amendment Regulations 1998 (S.I. 1998 No. 1663 (S. 91)])
- The Medical Act 1983 (Approved Medical Practices and Conditions of Residence) and National Health Service (General Medical Services) (Amendment) Regulations 1998 (S.I. 1998 No. 1664)
- The Eggs (Marketing Standards) (Amendment) Regulations 1998 (S.I. 1998 No. 1665)
- The Medical Act 1983 (Approved Medical Practices and Conditions of Residence) and National Health Service (General Medical Services) (Scotland) Amendment Regulations 1998 (S.I. 1998 No. 1667 (S. 92)])
- The Public Service Vehicles (Conditions of Fitness, Equipment, Use and Certification) (Amendment) Regulations 1998 (S.I. 1998 No. 1670)
- The Goods Vehicles (Plating and Testing) (Amendment) Regulations 1998 (S.I. 1998 No. 1671)
- The Motor Vehicles (Tests) (Amendment) Regulations 1998 (S.I. 1998 No. 1672)
- The Food (Cheese) (Emergency Control) (Amendment No. 2) Order 1998 (S.I. 1998 No. 1673)
- The Animals (Scientific Procedures) Act (Amendment to Schedule 2) Order 1998 (S.I. 1998 No. 1674)
- The Export and Investment Guarantees (Limit on Foreign Currency Commitments) Order 1998 (S.I. 1998 No. 1675)
- The Education (Student Loans) (Amendment) Regulations 1998 (S.I. 1998 No. 1676)
- The Northern Ireland Act 1974 (Interim Period Extension) Order 1998 (S.I. 1998 No. 1677)
- The Children (Performances) (Miscellaneous Amendments) Regulations 1998 (S.I. 1998 No. 1678)
- The Merchant Shipping (Distress Messages) Regulations 1998 (S.I. 1998 No. 1691)
- The Merchant Shipping (Co-operation with Search and Rescue Services) Regulations 1998 (S.I. 1998 No. 1692)
- The Jobseeker's Allowance (Amendment) (No. 2) Regulations 1998 (S.I. 1998 No. 1698)

== 1701–1800 ==
- The Noise Insulation (Railways and Other Guided Transport Systems) (Amendment) Regulations 1998 (S.I. 1998 No. 1701)
- The Companies (Forms) (Amendment) Regulations 1998 (S.I. 1998 No. 1702)
- The Wireless Telegraphy (Licence Charges) (Amendment No. 3) Regulations 1998 (S.I. 1998 No. 1703)
- The Combined Probation Areas (North Yorkshire) Order 1998 (S.I. 1998 No. 1704)
- The A205 Trunk Road (Lewisham) Red Route (Prescribed Route) Experimental Traffic Order 1998 (S.I. 1998 No. 1705)
- The A23 Trunk Road (Croydon) Red Route (No. 2) Experimental Traffic Order 1997 Variation Order 1998 (S.I. 1998 No. 1706)
- The M4 Motorway (Hillingdon and Hounslow) (Speed Limits) Regulations 1998 (S.I. 1998 No. 1708)
- The Welfare of Livestock (Amendment) Regulations 1998 (S.I. 1998 No. 1709)
- The Ecclesiastical Judges and Legal Officers (Fees) Order 1998 (S.I. 1998 No. 1711)
- The Legal Officers (Annual Fees) Order 1998 (S.I. 1998 No. 1712)
- The Faculty Jurisdiction (Appeals) Rules 1998 (S.I. 1998 No. 1713)
- The Parochial Fees Order 1998 (S.I. 1998 No. 1714)
- The National Institutions of The Church of England (Transfer of Functions) Order 1998 (S.I. 1998 No. 1715)
- The Education (Assisted Places) (Amendment) Regulations 1998 (S.I. 1998 No. 1726)
- The Cosmetic Products (Safety) (Amendment) Regulations 1998 (S.I. 1998 No. 1727)
- The Social Security (Categorisation of Earners) Amendment Regulations 1998 (S.I. 1998 No. 1728)
- The Teaching and Higher Education Act 1998 (Commencement No.1) Order 1998 (S.I. 1998 No. 1729 (C.33) (S.93)])
- The National Assistance (Assessment of Resources) (Amendment No. 2) Regulations 1998 (S.I. 1998 No. 1730)
- The Environmental Assessment (Forestry) Regulations 1998 (S.I. 1998 No. 1731)
- The Housing Benefit (General) Amendment Regulations 1998 (S.I. 1998 No. 1732)
- The East Berkshire Community Health National Health Service Trust (Establishment) Amendment Order 1998 (S.I. 1998 No. 1733)
- The A13 Trunk Road (Ironbridge to Canning Town Improvement, Trunk Road, Slip Roads and Bridges) Order 1998 (S.I. 1998 No. 1734)
- The Education (Grants for Education Support and Training) (England) Regulations 1998 (Amendment) Regulations 1998 (S.I. 1998 No. 1741)
- The Protection of Wrecks (Designation No. 2) Order 1984 (Amendment) Order 1998 (S.I. 1998 No. 1746)
- The Companies Act 1989 (Commencement No. 17) Order 1998 (S.I. 1998 No. 1747 (C.34)])
- The Financial Markets and Insolvency Regulations 1998 (S.I. 1998 No. 1748)
- The Government Stock (Amendment) Regulations 1998 (S.I. 1998 No. 1749)
- The European Communities (Designation) (No. 2) Order 1998 (S.I. 1998 No. 1750)
- Air Carrier Liability Order 1998 (S.I. 1998 No. 1751)
- The Angola (United Nations Sanctions) Order 1998 (S.I. 1998 No. 1752)
- The Angola (United Nations Sanctions) (Dependent Territories) Order 1998 (S.I. 1998 No. 1753)
- The Geneva Conventions Act (First Protocol) Order 1998 (S.I. 1998 No. 1754)
- The United Nations (International Tribunals) (Former Yugoslavia and Rwanda) (Amendment) Order 1998 (S.I. 1998 No. 1755)
- The Angola (United Nations Sanctions) (Channel Islands) Order 1998 (S.I. 1998 No. 1756)
- The Angola (United Nations Sanctions) (Isle of Man) Order 1998 (S.I. 1998 No. 1757)
- The Appropriation (No. 2) (Northern Ireland) Order 1998 (S.I. 1998 No. 1758 (N.I. 12)])
- Education (Northern Ireland) Order 1998 (S.I. 1998 No. 1759 (N.I. 13)])
- The Education (Student Support) (Northern Ireland) Order 1998 (S.I. 1998 No. 1760 (N.I. 14)])
- The Employment Rights (Time off for Study or Training) (Northern Ireland) Order 1998 (S.I. 1998 No. 1761 (N.I. 15)])
- Producer Responsibility Obligations (Northern Ireland) Order 1998 (S.I. 1998 No. 1762 (N.I. 16)])
- The Public Interest Disclosure (Northern Ireland) Order 1998 (S.I. 1998 No. 1763 (N.I. 17)])
- The Trial of the Pyx Order 1998 (S.I. 1998 No. 1764)
- The Education (Inspectors of Schools in Wales) (No. 2) Order 1998 (S.I. 1998 No. 1765)
- The Housing Act 1996 (Commencement No. 12 and Transitional Provision) Order 1998 (S.I. 1998 No. 1768 (C.35)])
- The Sheffield City Airport Licensing (Liquor) Order 1998 (S.I. 1998 No. 1769)
- The Trade Marks (Fees) Rules 1998 (S.I. 1998 No. 1776)
- The Registered Designs (Fees) Rules 1998 (S.I. 1998 No. 1777)
- The Patents (Fees) Rules 1998 (S.I. 1998 No. 1778)
- The Gas Act 1986 (Exemption) Order 1998 (S.I. 1998 No. 1779)
- The Merchant Shipping (Liability of Shipowners and Others) (Rate of Interest) Order 1998 (S.I. 1998 No. 1795)
- The Cattle Database Regulations 1998 (S.I. 1998 No. 1796)
- The Humber Bridge (Debts) Order 1998 (S.I. 1998 No. 1797)
- The Hertfordshire (Coroners' Districts) (Amendment) Order 1998 (S.I. 1998 No. 1799)
- The Environmentally Sensitive Areas (Cotswold Hills) Designation (Amendment) Order 1998 (S.I. 1998 No. 1800)

== 1801–1900 ==
- The Food Protection (Emergency Prohibitions) (Paralytic Shellfish Poisoning) Order 1998 Partial Revocation Order 1998 (S.I. 1998 No. 1801)
- The Restriction of Liberty Order (Scotland) Regulations 1998 (S.I. 1998 No. 1802 (S. 94)])
- The Environmentally Sensitive Areas (Upper Thames Tributaries) Designation (Amendment) Order 1998 (S.I. 1998 No. 1803)
- The Local Government (Direct Labour Organisations) (Competition) (Insolvency) (Amendment) (England) Regulations 1998 (S.I. 1998 No. 1805)
- The Local Government Act 1988 (Defined Activities) (Exemption) (Insolvency) (England and Wales) Order 1998 (S.I. 1998 No. 1806)
- The Motor Cycles (Protective Helmets) Regulations 1998 (S.I. 1998 No. 1807)
- The A10 Trunk Road (Haringey) Red Route (Prohibited Turn) Traffic Order 1998 (S.I. 1998 No. 1808)
- The A2 Trunk Road (Bexley) Red Route Traffic Order 1996 Variation Order 1998 (S.I. 1998 No. 1809)
- The Land Registration (Scotland) Act 1979 (Commencement No.11) Order 1998 (S.I. 1998 No. 1810 (C.36) (S.95)])
- The Social Security (Guardian's Allowances) Amendment Regulations 1998 (S.I. 1998 No. 1811)
- The Houses in Multiple Occupation (Charges for Registration Schemes) Regulations 1998 (S.I. 1998 No. 1812)
- The Houses in Multiple Occupation (Fees for Registration Schemes) (Amendment) Order 1998 (S.I. 1998 No. 1813)
- Coventry Airport (Designation) (Detention and Sale of Aircraft) Order 1998 (S.I. 1998 No. 1827)
- The Fossil Fuel Levy (Amendment) Regulations 1998 (S.I. 1998 No. 1828)
- The Local Government Pension Scheme(Management and Investment of Funds) Regulations 1998 (S.I. 1998 No. 1831)
- Working Time Regulations 1998 (S.I. 1998 No. 1833)
- The Education (Individual Performance Information) (Identification of Individual Pupils) Regulations 1998 (S.I. 1998 No. 1834)
- The A205 Trunk Road (Lewisham) Red Route Traffic Order 1998 (S.I. 1998 No. 1835)
- The Building Act 1984 (Commencement No. 2) Order 1998 (S.I. 1998 No. 1836 (C. 37)])
- The Magistrates' Courts (Procedure) Act 1998 (Commencement No. 1) Order 1998 (S.I. 1998 No. 1837 (C.38)])
- The Merchant Shipping (Code of Safe Working Practices for Merchant Seamen) Regulations 1998 (S.I. 1998 No. 1838)
- The Amusement Machine Licence Duty (Monetary Amounts) Order 1998 (S.I. 1998 No. 1839)
- The Pneumoconiosis etc. (Workers’ Compensation) (Payment of Claims) Amendment Regulations 1998 (S.I. 1998 No. 1840)
- The Royal Infirmary of Edinburgh National Health Service Trust (Establishment) Amendment Order 1998 (S.I. 1998 No. 1841 (S.96)])
- Act of Adjournal (Criminal Procedure Rules Amendment) (Restriction of Liberty Orders) 1998 (S.I. 1998 No. 1842 (S.97)])
- The Safety of Sports Grounds (Designation) Order 1998 (S.I. 1998 No. 1845)
- The Occupational Pension Schemes (Validation of Rule Alterations) Regulations 1998 (S.I. 1998 No. 1846)
- The International Monetary Fund (Increase in Subscription) Order 1998 (S.I. 1998 No. 1854)
- The West of Scotland Water Authority (Loch Lossit, Islay) (Amendment) Water Order 1998 (S.I. 1998 No. 1855 (S.98)])
- The Private Water Supplies (Scotland) Amendment Regulations 1998 (S.I. 1998 No. 1856 (S. 99)])
- The Northern Ireland (Sentences) Act 1998 (Commencement) Order 1998 (S.I. 1998 No. 1858 (C.39)])
- The Northern Ireland (Sentences) Act 1998 (Sentence Review Commissioners) Rules 1998 (S.I. 1998 No. 1859)
- The Conditional Fee Agreements Order 1998 (S.I. 1998 No. 1860)
- The Local Government Act 1988 (Defined Activities) (Exemption) (Cherwell District Council) Order 1998 (S.I. 1998 No. 1862)
- The Foreign Satellite Service Proscription Order 1998 (S.I. 1998 No. 1865)
- The Education (School Inspection) (Wales) Regulations 1998 (S.I. 1998 No. 1866)
- The Education (School Performance Information) (Wales) Regulations 1998 (S.I. 1998 No. 1867)
- The Gifts for Relief in Poor Countries (Designation) Order 1998 (S.I. 1998 No. 1868)
- The Personal Equity Plan (Amendment) Regulations 1998 (S.I. 1998 No. 1869)
- The Individual Savings Account Regulations 1998 (S.I. 1998 No. 1870)
- The Individual Savings Account (Insurance Companies) Regulations 1998 (S.I. 1998 No. 1871)
- The Insurance Companies (Overseas Life Assurance Business) (Compliance) (Amendment) Regulations 1998 (S.I. 1998 No. 1872)
- The Republic of Serbia (Prohibition on Investment) Regulations 1998 (S.I. 1998 No. 1873)
- The Education (Grants for Early Excellence Centres) (England) Regulations 1998 (S.I. 1998 No. 1877)
- The School Standards and Framework Act 1998 (Education Action Zones) (Modification) Regulations 1998 (S.I. 1998 No. 1878)
- The Superannuation (Admission to Schedule 1 to the Superannuation Act 1972) (No. 2) Order 1998 (S.I. 1998 No. 1879)
- The Civil Courts (Amendment) Order 1998 (S.I. 1998 No. 1880)
- The Special Immigration Appeals Commission (Procedure) Rules 1998 (S.I. 1998 No. 1881)
- The Northern Ireland (Sentences) Act 1998 (S.I. 1998 No. 1882)
- The Crime and Disorder Act 1998 (Commencement No. 1) Order 1998 (S.I. 1998 No. 1883 (C. 40))
- The Education (School Teachers’ Pay and Conditions) (No. 2) Order 1998 (S.I. 1998 No. 1884)
- The Education (National Curriculum) (Attainment Targets and Programmes of Study in Geography) (Wales) Order 1998 (S.I. 1998 No. 1885)
- The Education (National Curriculum) (Attainment Targets and Programmes of Study in Art) (Wales) Order 1998 (S.I. 1998 No. 1886)
- The Education (National Curriculum) (Attainment Targets and Programmes of Study in Physical Education) (Wales) Order 1998 (S.I. 1998 No. 1887)
- The Education (National Curriculum) (Attainment Targets and Programmes of Study in History) (Wales) Order 1998 (S.I. 1998 No. 1888)
- The Education (National Curriculum) (Attainment Targets and Programmes of Study in Music) (Wales) Order 1998 (S.I. 1998 No. 1889)
- The Education (National Curriculum) (Attainment Targets and Programmes of Study in Technology) (Wales) Order 1998 (S.I. 1998 No. 1890)
- The Income Tax (Employments) (Notional Payments) (Amendment) Regulations 1998 (S.I. 1998 No. 1891)
- The Special Immigration Appeals Commission Act 1997 (Commencement No. 2) Order 1998 (S.I. 1998 No. 1892 (C. 41)])
- The Rules of the Supreme Court (Amendment) 1998 (S.I. 1998 No. 1898 (L.2)])
- The County Court (Amendment) Rules 1998 (S.I. 1998 No. 1899 (L.3)])
- The County Courts (Forms) (Amendment) Rules 1998 (S.I. 1998 No. 1900 (L.4))

== 1901–2000 ==
- The Family Proceedings (Amendment) Rules 1998 (S.I. 1998 No. 1901 (L.5)])
- The Protection from Harassment Act 1997 (Commencement No. 3) Order 1998 (S.I. 1998 No. 1902 (C.42)])
- The Non-Contentious Probate (Amendment) Rules 1998 (S.I. 1998 No. 1903 (L.6)])
- The Parole Board (Scotland) Amendment Rules 1998 (S.I. 1998 No. 1904 (S.100)])
- The Dartford-Thurrock Crossing Tolls Order 1998 (S.I. 1998 No. 1907)
- The Dartford-Thurrock Crossing Regulations 1998 (S.I. 1998 No. 1908)
- The Social Fund Winter Fuel Payment Amendment Regulations 1998 (S.I. 1998 No. 1910)
- The Merchant Shipping (Registration of Ships) (Tonnage Amendment) Regulations 1998 (S.I. 1998 No. 1915)
- The Merchant Shipping (Tonnage) (Fishing Vessels) (Amendment) Regulations 1998 (S.I. 1998 No. 1916)
- The Deregulation (Exchangeable Driving Licences) Order 1998 (S.I. 1998 No. 1917)
- The Local Government (Committees and Political Groups) (Amendment) Regulations 1998 (S.I. 1998 No. 1918)
- The A406 Trunk Road (Hanger Lane, Ealing) Red Route (Prohibited Turns) Traffic Order 1998 (S.I. 1998 No. 1919)
- The Secure Training Order (Transitory Provisions) Order 1998 (S.I. 1998 No. 1928)
- The Education (School Performance Information) (England) Regulations 1998 (S.I. 1998 No. 1929)
- The Greater Manchester (Light Rapid Transit System) (Ashton-under-Lyne Extension) Order 1998 (S.I. 1998 No. 1936)
- The Local Authorities (Capital Finance) (Amendment No. 3) Regulations 1998 (S.I. 1998 No. 1937)
- The Scottish Legal Aid Board (Employment of Solicitors to Provide Criminal Legal Assistance) Regulations 1998 (S.I. 1998 No. 1938 (S.101)])
- The Firearms Rules 1998 (S.I. 1998 No. 1941)
- The Education (Plans for Reducing Infant Class Sizes) (Wales) Regulations 1998 (S.I. 1998 No. 1942)
- The Education (Infant Class Sizes) (Wales) Regulations 1998 (S.I. 1998 No. 1943)
- The Consumer Credit (Exempt Agreements) (Amendment) Order 1998 (S.I. 1998 No. 1944)
- The Foreign Package Holidays (Tour Operators and Travel Agents) Order 1998 (S.I. 1998 No. 1945)
- The Deregulation (Taxis and Private Hire Vehicles) Order 1998 (S.I. 1998 No. 1946)
- The Education (Infant Class Sizes) (Transitional Provisions) Regulations 1998 (S.I. 1998 No. 1947)
- The Education Act 1996 (Infant Class Sizes) (Modification) Regulations 1998 (S.I. 1998 No. 1948)
- The A41 Trunk Road (Camden) (Temporary Prohibition of Traffic) (No. 3) Order 1998 (S.I. 1998 No. 1949)
- The A41 Trunk Road (Camden) (Temporary Prohibition of Traffic) (No. 4) Order 1998 (S.I. 1998 No. 1950)
- The A4 Trunk Road (Hammersmith & Fulham and Kensington & Chelsea) Red Route Experimental Traffic Order 1997 Variation Order 1998 (S.I. 1998 No. 1951)
- The Barnsley Education Action Zone Order 1998 (S.I. 1998 No. 1952)
- The Blackburn and Darwen Education Action Zone Order 1998 (S.I. 1998 No. 1953)
- The CfBT/Lambeth Education Action Zone Order 1998 (S.I. 1998 No. 1954)
- The Herefordshire Education Action Zone Order 1998 (S.I. 1998 No. 1955)
- The Leicester (South and West) Education Action Zone Order 1998 (S.I. 1998 No. 1956)
- The East Middlesbrough Education Action Zone Order 1998 (S.I. 1998 No. 1957)
- The Newcastle Education Action Zone Order 1998 (S.I. 1998 No. 1958)
- The New Addington Education Action Zone Order 1998 (S.I. 1998 No. 1959)
- The Newham Education Action Zone Order 1998 (S.I. 1998 No. 1960)
- The Next Step North East Lincolnshire Education Action Zone Order 1998 (S.I. 1998 No. 1961)
- The Salford & Trafford Education Action Zone Order 1998 (S.I. 1998 No. 1962)
- The N. Somerset Education Action Zone Order 1998 (S.I. 1998 No. 1963)
- The Education Action Forum (Proceedings) Regulations 1998 (S.I. 1998 No. 1964)
- The Education (Fees and Awards) (Amendment) Regulations 1998 (S.I. 1998 No. 1965)
- The Education (Assisted Places) (Amendment) (No. 2) Regulations 1998 (S.I. 1998 No. 1966)
- The Assured and Protected Tenancies (Lettings to Students) Regulations 1998 (S.I. 1998 No. 1967)
- The School Standards and Framework Act 1998 (Infant Class Sizes) (Modification) Regulations 1998 (S.I. 1998 No. 1968)
- The Education (Allocation of Grant-maintained and Grant-maintained Special Schools to New Categories) Regulations 1998 (S.I. 1998 No. 1969)
- The Education (Prescribed Courses of Higher Education) (Wales) (Amendment) Regulations 1998 (S.I. 1998 No. 1970)
- The Education (Plans for Reducing Infant Class Sizes) (England) Regulations 1998 (S.I. 1998 No. 1971)
- The Education (Mandatory Awards) Regulations 1998 (Amendment) Regulations 1998 (S.I. 1998 No. 1972)
- The Education (Infant Class Sizes) (England) Regulations 1998 (S.I. 1998 No. 1973)
- The Animals (Scientific Procedures) Act 1986 (Amendment) Regulations 1998 (S.I. 1998 No. 1974)
- The National Health Service Trusts (Membership and Procedure) Amendment Regulations 1998 (S.I. 1998 No. 1975)
- The Education (National Curriculum) (Key Stage 3 Assessment Arrangements) (Wales) (Amendment) Order 1998 (S.I. 1998 No. 1976)
- The Education (National Curriculum) (Assessment Arrangements for English, Welsh, Mathematics and Science) (Key Stage 2) (Wales) (Amendment) Order 1998 (S.I. 1998 No. 1977)
- The Education (National Curriculum) (Attainment Targets and Programmes of Study in Technology) (England) Order 1998 (S.I. 1998 No. 1986)
- The Education (National Curriculum) (Attainment Targets and Programmes of Study in Physical Education) (England) Order 1998 (S.I. 1998 No. 1987)
- The Education (National Curriculum) (Attainment Targets and Programmes of Study in History) (England) Order 1998 (S.I. 1998 No. 1988)
- The Education (National Curriculum) (Attainment Targets and Programmes of Study in Geography) (England) Order 1998 (S.I. 1998 No. 1989)
- The Education (National Curriculum) (Attainment Targets and Programmes of Study in Art) (England) Order 1998 (S.I. 1998 No. 1990)
- The Education (National Curriculum) (Attainment Targets and Programmes of Study in Music) (England) Order 1998 (S.I. 1998 No. 1991)
- The Harrow and Hillingdon Healthcare National Health Service Trust (Establishment) Amendment Order 1998 (S.I. 1998 No. 1992)
- Act of Sederunt (Child Care and Maintenance Rules) (Amendment) 1998 (S.I. 1998 No. 1993 (S.102)])
- The Education (Assisted Places) (Scotland) Amendment (No.2) Regulations 1998 (S.I. 1998 No. 1994 (S.103)])
- The National Health Service (Primary Care) Act 1997 (Commencement No. 5) Order 1998 (S.I. 1998 No. 1998 (C.43))

== 2001–2100 ==
- The Education (Student Support) Regulations 1998 (S.I. 1998 No. 2003)
- The Teaching and Higher Education Act 1998 (Commencement No. 2 and Transitional Provisions) Order 1998 (S.I. 1998 No. 2004)
- The Education (Student Loans) (Amendment No. 2) Regulations 1998 (S.I. 1998 No. 2005)
- The Community Drivers' Hours and Recording Equipment (Amendment) Regulations 1998 (S.I. 1998 No. 2006)
- The Housing (Right To Acquire) (Discount) Order 1998 (S.I. 1998 No. 2014)
- The Housing (Right to Buy) (Priority of Charges) (No. 2) Order 1998 (S.I. 1998 No. 2015)
- The Road Traffic Act 1991 (Amendment of Schedule 3) (Scotland) Order 1998 (S.I. 1998 No. 2018 (S. 104)])
- The Removal and Disposal of Vehicles (Amendment) Regulations 1998 (S.I. 1998 No. 2019 (S. 105)])
- The Parking Attendants (Wearing of Uniforms) (Edinburgh Parking Area) Regulations 1998 (S.I. 1998 No. 2020 (S. 106)])
- The Education (National Curriculum) (Exceptions at Key Stage 4) Regulations 1998 (S.I. 1998 No. 2021)
- The Fertilisers (Amendment) Regulations 1998 (S.I. 1998 No. 2024)
- The Agricultural Holdings (Units of Production) Order 1998 (S.I. 1998 No. 2025)
- The Education (Student Loans) (Scotland) Regulations 1998 (S.I. 1998 No. 2026 (S. 107)])
- The Chiropractors Act 1994 (Commencement No. 1 and Transitional Provision) Order 1998 (S.I. 1998 No. 2031 (C.44)])
- The Outer Space Act 1986 (Fees) (Amendment) Regulations 1998 (S.I. 1998 No. 2032)
- The Cardiff Community Healthcare National Health Service Trust (Establishment) Amendment Order 1998 (S.I. 1998 No. 2033)
- The East Glamorgan National Health Service Trust (Establishment) Amendment Order 1998 (S.I. 1998 No. 2034)
- The A41 Trunk Road (Westminster) Red Route Traffic Order 1998 Variation Order 1998 (S.I. 1998 No. 2035)
- The Motor Vehicles (Driving Licences) (Amendment) (No. 4) Regulations 1998 (S.I. 1998 No. 2038)
- The Food Protection (Emergency Prohibitions) (Paralytic Shellfish Poisoning) Order 1998 Partial Revocation (No.2) Order 1998 (S.I. 1998 No. 2045)
- The Local Government Act 1988 (Defined Activities) (Exemptions) (Castle Morpeth Borough Council and West Somerset and Uttlesford District Councils) Order 1998 (S.I. 1998 No. 2047)
- The School Standards and Framework Act 1998 (Commencement No. 1) Order 1998 (S.I. 1998 No. 2048 (C.45)])
- The Local Government Act 1988 (Defined Activities) (Exemptions) (Chiltern District Council, Lewes District Council and Eastbourne Borough Council) Order 1998 (S.I. 1998 No. 2049)
- The Local Government Act 1988 (Defined Activities) (Exemption) (Derwentside and Wyre Forest District Councils) Order 1998 (S.I. 1998 No. 2050)
- The Motor Vehicles (EC Type Approval) Regulations 1998 (S.I. 1998 No. 2051)
- The Gaming Duty (Amendment) Regulations 1998 (S.I. 1998 No. 2055)
- The Merchant Shipping (Radio Installations) Regulations 1998 (S.I. 1998 No. 2070)
- The Combined Probation Areas (Lancashire) Order 1998 (S.I. 1998 No. 2071)
- The Feeding Stuffs (Amendment) (No. 2) Regulations 1998 (S.I. 1998 No. 2072)
- The Brucellosis and Tuberculosis (England and Wales) Compensation (Amendment) Order 1998 (S.I. 1998 No. 2073)
- The Cod (Specified Sea Areas) (Prohibition of Fishing) (Revocation) Order 1998 (S.I. 1998 No. 2074)
- The Sole (Specified Sea Area) (Prohibition of Fishing) Order 1998 (S.I. 1998 No. 2075)
- The Prescription Only Medicines (Human Use) Amendment (No. 3) Order 1998 (S.I. 1998 No. 2081)
- The Housing (Change of Landlord) (Payment of Disposal Cost by Instalments) (Amendment) (No. 2) Regulations 1998 (S.I. 1998 No. 2082)
- The School Standards and Framework Act 1998 (Appointed Day) Order 1998 (S.I. 1998 No. 2083 (c. 48)])
- The Newcastle Education Action Zone (No. 2) Order 1998 (S.I. 1998 No. 2084)
- The Blackburn with Darwen Education Action Zone Order 1998 (S.I. 1998 No. 2085)
- The Meat (Hygiene and Inspection) (Charges) Regulations 1998 (S.I. 1998 No. 2095)

== 2101–2200 ==
- The School Standards and Framework Act 1998 (School Teachers' Pay and Conditions) (Transitional Provisions) Regulations 1998 (S.I. 1998 No. 2115)
- The Mid Essex Hospital Services National Health Service Trust (Establishment) Amendment Order 1998 (S.I. 1998 No. 2116)
- The Social Security Amendment (New Deal) (No.2) Regulations 1998 (S.I. 1998 No. 2117)
- The Local Government Pension Scheme (Transitional Provisions etc.) (Amendment) Regulations 1998 (S.I. 1998 No. 2118)
- The Food Protection (Emergency Prohibitions) (Paralytic Shellfish Poisoning) Order 1998 Partial Revocation (No.3) Order 1998 (S.I. 1998 No. 2119)
- The Education (Funding for Teacher Training) Designation (No. 2) Order 1998 (S.I. 1998 No. 2120)
- The Llandeilo–Carmarthen Trunk Road (A40) (Pont-ar-Gothi By-Pass) (Revocation) Order 1998 (S.I. 1998 No. 2121)
- The Prevention of Water Pollution (Greenside, Jaw, Cochno, Burncrooks, Kilmannan, Black Linn, Greenland 1, 2 & 3, Garshake, Fin and Loch Humphrey) (Extension of Period of Byelaws) Order 1998 (S.I. 1998 No. 2127 (S. 108)])
- Act of Sederunt (Child Care and Maintenance Rules) (Amendment No.2) 1998 (S.I. 1998 No. 2130 (S. 109)])
- The River Esk Salmon Fishery District (Baits and Lures) Regulations 1998 (S.I. 1998 No. 2131 (S. 110)])
- The Nitrate Sensitive Areas (Amendment) (No. 2) Regulations 1998 (S.I. 1998 No. 2138)
- The Public Telecommunication System Designation (National Band Three Limited) Order 1998 (S.I. 1998 No. 2139)
- The Public Telecommunication System Designation (Tetralink Telecommunications Limited) Order 1998 (S.I. 1998 No. 2140)
- The Public Telecommunication System Designation (TeleDanmark A/S) Order 1998 (S.I. 1998 No. 2141)
- The Public Telecommunication System Designation (PSI Net Telecom UK Limited) Order 1998 (S.I. 1998 No. 2142)
- The Public Telecommunication System Designation (DirectNet Telecommunications UK Limited) Order 1998 (S.I. 1998 No. 2143)
- The Public Telecommunication System Designation (Singtel (Europe) Limited) Order 1998 (S.I. 1998 No. 2144)
- The Public Telecommunication System Designation (Startec Telecom Limited) Order 1998 (S.I. 1998 No. 2145)
- The Public Telecommunication System Designation(o.tel.o communications Limited) Order 1998 (S.I. 1998 No. 2146)
- The Public Telecommunication System Designation (Stentor Communications Limited) Order 1998 (S.I. 1998 No. 2147)
- The Public Telecommunication System Designation (Transline Communications Limited) Order 1998 (S.I. 1998 No. 2148)
- The Public Telecommunication System Designation (GN Great Northern Gateway Ltd. A/S) Order 1998 (S.I. 1998 No. 2149)
- The Gaming Machines (Maximum Prizes)Regulations 1998 (S.I. 1998 No. 2150)
- The Gaming Clubs (Multiple Bingo) (Amendment) Regulations 1998 (S.I. 1998 No. 2151)
- The Gaming Act (Variation of Monetary Limits) (No. 2) Order 1998 (S.I. 1998 No. 2152)
- The Gaming (Bingo) Act (Variation of Monetary Limit) Order 1998 (S.I. 1998 No. 2153)
- The Smoke Control Areas (Authorised Fuels) (Amendment) Regulations 1998 (S.I. 1998 No. 2154)
- The District of Purbeck (Electoral Changes) Order 1998 (S.I. 1998 No. 2159)
- The Housing Benefit and Council Tax Benefit Amendment (New Deal) Regulations 1998 (S.I. 1998 No. 2164)
- The Magistrates' Courts (Grants) Regulations 1998 (S.I. 1998 No. 2165)
- The Children (Allocation of Proceedings) (Amendment) Order 1998 (S.I. 1998 No. 2166)
- The Magistrates' Courts (Miscellaneous Amendments) Rules 1998 (S.I. 1998 No. 2167 (L.7)])
- The Crown Court (Amendment) Rules 1998 (S.I. 1998 No. 2168 (L.8)])
- The Investor Compensation Scheme Regulations 1998 (S.I. 1998 No. 2169)
- The Medicines (Products Other Than Veterinary Drugs) (General Sale List) Amendment Order 1998 (S.I. 1998 No. 2170)
- The A205 Trunk Road (Lewisham) Red Route (Bus Lanes) Experimental Traffic Order 1998 (S.I. 1998 No. 2171)
- The Environmentally Sensitive Areas (Avon Valley) Designation (Amendment) (No. 2) Order 1998 (S.I. 1998 No. 2172)
- The Environmentally Sensitive Areas (North Peak) Designation (Amendment) (No. 2) Order 1998 (S.I. 1998 No. 2173)
- The Environmentally Sensitive Areas (Exmoor) Designation (Amendment) (No. 2) Order 1998 (S.I. 1998 No. 2174)
- The Environmentally Sensitive Areas (South Wessex Downs) Designation (Amendment) (No. 2) Order 1998 (S.I. 1998 No. 2175)
- The Environmentally Sensitive Areas (North Kent Marshes) Designation (Amendment) (No. 2) Order 1998 (S.I. 1998 No. 2176)
- The Environmentally Sensitive Areas (Lake District) Designation (Amendment) (No. 2) Order 1998 (S.I. 1998 No. 2177)
- The Environmentally Sensitive Areas (Test Valley) Designation (Amendment) (No. 2) Order 1998 (S.I. 1998 No. 2178)
- The Brucellosis and Tuberculosis (Scotland) Compensation Amendment Order 1998 (S.I. 1998 No. 2181 (S.111)])
- The A10 Trunk Road (Haringey) Red Route Experimental Traffic Order 1998 (S.I. 1998 No. 2184)
- The Local Government Act 1988 (Defined Activities) (Exemptions) (Wales) (Amendment) Order 1998 (S.I. 1998 No. 2188)
- The Local Government Act 1988 (Defined Activities) (Housing Management) (Exemptions) (Wales) (Amendment) Order 1998 (S.I. 1998 No. 2189)
- The Local Government Act 1988 (Direct Service Organisations) (Accounts etc.) (Extension) (Wales) (Amendment) Order 1998 (S.I. 1998 No. 2190)
- The Local Government Act 1988 (Defined Activities) (Works Contracts) (Exemptions) (Wales) (Amendment) Order 1998 (S.I. 1998 No. 2191)
- The Local Government Act 1988 (Competition) (Wales) Regulations 1998 (S.I. 1998 No. 2192)
- The Local Authorities (Direct Labour Organisations) (Competition) (Wales) (Amendment) Regulations 1998 (S.I. 1998 No. 2193)
- The Land Authority for Wales (Transfer of Staff) Order 1998 (S.I. 1998 No. 2194)
- The Development Board for Rural Wales (Transfer of Staff) Order 1998 (S.I. 1998 No. 2195)
- The Education (School Performance Targets) (Wales) Regulations 1998 (S.I. 1998 No. 2196)
- The Service Subsidy Agreements (Tendering) (Amendment) Regulations 1998 (S.I. 1998 No. 2197)
- The Merchant Shipping (Port State Control) (Amendment No. 2) Regulations 1998 (S.I. 1998 No. 2198)

== 2201–2300 ==
- The Plant Health (Forestry) (Great Britain) (Amendment) Order 1998 (S.I. 1998 No. 2206)
- The Amusement Machine Licence Duty (Small-prize Machines) Order 1998 (S.I. 1998 No. 2207)
- The Scottish College of Textiles (Closure) (Scotland) Order 1998 (S.I. 1998 No. 2208 (S.112)])
- The Social Security Act 1998 (Commencement No. 1) Order 1998 (S.I. 1998 No. 2209 (C.47)])
- The Wireless Telegraphy (Licence Charges) (Channel Islands and Isle of Man) Regulations 1998 (S.I. 1998 No. 2210)
- The Social Security (Contributions) Amendment (No. 3) Regulations 1998 (S.I. 1998 No. 2211)
- The School Standards and Framework Act 1998 (Commencement No. 2 and Supplemental, Saving and Transitional Provisions) Order 1998 (S.I. 1998 No. 2212 (C. 49)])
- The Combined Fire Authorities (Secure Tenancies) (England) Regulations 1998 (S.I. 1998 No. 2213)
- The Combined Fire Authorities (Secure Tenancies) (Wales) Regulations 1998 (S.I. 1998 No. 2214)
- The Teaching and Higher Education Act 1998 (Commencement No. 3) Order 1998 (S.I. 1998 No. 2215 (C. 50)])
- The National Health Service Pension Scheme Amendment (No. 2) Regulations 1998 (S.I. 1998 No. 2216)
- The National Health Service (Injury Benefits) Amendment (No. 2) Regulations 1998 (S.I. 1998 No. 2217)
- The Measuring Equipment (Liquid Fuel and Lubricants) (Amendment) Regulations 1998 (S.I. 1998 No. 2218)
- The Education (Grammar School Designation) Order 1998 (S.I. 1998 No. 2219)
- The Education (Further Education Institutions Information) (England) (Amendment) Regulations 1998 (S.I. 1998 No. 2220)
- The National Health Service (Dental Charges) Amendment Regulations 1998 (S.I. 1998 No. 2221)
- The National Health Service (Choice of Dental Practitioner) Regulations 1998 (S.I. 1998 No. 2222)
- The Dental Practice Boards (Personal Dental Services) Regulations 1998 (S.I. 1998 No. 2223)
- The National Health Service (Pilot Schemes for Personal Dental Services: Miscellaneous Provisions and Consequential Amendments) Regulations 1998 (S.I. 1998 No. 2224)
- The Transport and Works (Assessment of Environmental Effects) Regulations 1998 (S.I. 1998 No. 2226)
- The Environment Agency (Transfer of Functions of the Swavesey Internal Drainage Board) Order 1998 (S.I. 1998 No. 2227)
- The Axmouth Harbour Revision Order 1998 (S.I. 1998 No. 2228)
- The Education (Proportion of Selective Admissions) Regulations 1998 (S.I. 1998 No. 2229)
- The School Standards and Framework Act 1998 (Admissions) (Modifications) Regulations 1998 (S.I. 1998 No. 2230)
- The Social Security (Welfare to Work) Regulations 1998 (S.I. 1998 No. 2231)
- The Environmentally Sensitive Areas (West Penwith) Designation (Amendment) (No. 2) Order 1998 (S.I. 1998 No. 2232)
- The Road Traffic (Parking Adjudicators) (City of Edinburgh) Regulations 1998 (S.I. 1998 No. 2233 (S.113)])
- The Dissolution of the Cable Authority Order 1998 (S.I. 1998 No. 2237)
- The Merchant Shipping (Load Line) Regulations 1998 (S.I. 1998 No. 2241)
- The A23 Trunk Road (Croydon) Red Route (Prohibited Turns) (No. 3) Experimental Traffic Order 1998 (S.I. 1998 No. 2242)
- The Finance Act 1998, Schedule 2, (Appointed Day) Order 1998 (S.I. 1998 No. 2243 (C. 51)])
- The Government of Wales Act 1998 (Commencement No. 1) Order 1998 (S.I. 1998 No. 2244 (C.52)])
- The Plant Health (Great Britain) (Amendment) (No. 3) Order 1998 (S.I. 1998 No. 2245)
- The Disposal of Waste (Control of Beet Rhizomania Disease) (Revocation) Order 1998 (S.I. 1998 No. 2246)
- The Motor Cars (Driving Instruction) (Amendment) Regulations 1998 (S.I. 1998 No. 2247)
- The School Standards and Framework Act 1998 (Intervention in Schools Causing Concern) (Modification) Regulations 1998 (S.I. 1998 No. 2248)
- The Motor Vehicles (Authorisation of Special Types) (Amendment) Order 1998 (S.I. 1998 No. 2249)
- The Social Security Amendment (Capital) Regulations 1998 (S.I. 1998 No. 2250)
- The High Court of Justiciary (Proceedings in the Netherlands) (United Nations) Order 1998 (S.I. 1998 No. 2251)
- The Royal College of Ophthalmologists (Charter Amendment) Order 1998 (S.I. 1998 No. 2252)
- The Monopoly References (Deletion of Exclusions) Order 1998 (S.I. 1998 No. 2253)
- The Road Works (Registers, Notices, Directions and Designations) (Scotland) Amendment Regulations 1998 (S.I. 1998 No. 2254 (S.114)])
- The Teachers' Pensions (Amendment) Regulations 1998 (S.I. 1998 No. 2255)
- The Teachers (Compensation for Redundancy and Premature Retirement) (Amendment) Regulations 1998 (S.I. 1998 No. 2256)
- The Extraction Solvents in Food (Amendment) Regulations 1998 (S.I. 1998 No. 2257)
- The National Health Service (Dental Charges) (Scotland) Amendment (No. 2) Regulations 1998 (S.I. 1998 No. 2258 (S.115)])
- The National Health Service (Choice of Dental Practitioner) (Scotland) Regulations 1998 (S.I. 1998 No. 2259 (S.116)])
- The Local Government Act 1988 (Defined Activities) (Exemption) (East Lindsey and Suffolk Coastal District Councils) Order 1998 (S.I. 1998 No. 2275)
- The Yugoslavia (Prohibition of Flights) Regulations 1998 (S.I. 1998 No. 2284)
- The Registration of Births, Still-Births, Deaths and Marriages (Prescription of Forms) (Scotland) Amendment Regulations 1998 (S.I. 1998 No. 2285 (S. 117))

== 2301–2400 ==
- The Provision and Use of Work Equipment Regulations 1998 (S.I. 1998 No. 2306)
- Lifting Operations and Lifting Equipment Regulations 1998 (S.I. 1998 No. 2307)
- The Stockport Healthcare National Health Service Trust (Establishment) Amendment Order 1998 (S.I. 1998 No. 2310)
- The Town and Country Planning (Inquiries Procedure) (Scotland) Amendment Rules 1998 (S.I. 1998 No. 2311 (S.118)])
- The Town and Country Planning Appeals (Determination by Appointed Person) (Inquiries Procedure) (Scotland) Amendment Rules 1998 (S.I. 1998 No. 2312 (S.119)])
- The Compulsory Purchase by Public Authorities (Inquiries Procedure) (Scotland) Rules 1998 (S.I. 1998 No. 2313 (S.120)])
- The Sports Grounds and Sporting Events (Designation) (Scotland) Order 1998 (S.I. 1998 No. 2314 (S.121)])
- The Social Security (Contributions) Amendment (No. 4) Regulations 1998 (S.I. 1998 No. 2320)
- The Education (Fees and Awards) (Scotland) Amendment Regulations 1998 (S.I. 1998 No. 2324 (S.122)])
- The Crime and Disorder Act 1998 (Commencement No. 2 and Transitional Provisions) Order 1998 (S.I. 1998 No. 2327 (C. 53)])
- The Friendly Societies (Activities of a Subsidiary) Order 1998 (S.I. 1998 No. 2328)
- The Local Government and Rating Act 1997 (Commencement No. 5 and Transitional Provision) Order 1998 (S.I. 1998 No. 2329 (C. 54)])
- The Building (Approved Inspectors etc.) (Amendment) Regulations 1998 (S.I. 1998 No. 2332)
- The Borough of Boston (Electoral Changes) Order 1998 (S.I. 1998 No. 2333)
- The City of Lincoln (Electoral Changes) Order 1998 (S.I. 1998 No. 2334)
- The District of East Lindsey (Electoral Changes) Order 1998 (S.I. 1998 No. 2335)
- The District of South Holland (Electoral Changes) Order 1998 (S.I. 1998 No. 2336)
- The District of South Kesteven (Electoral Changes) Order 1998 (S.I. 1998 No. 2337)
- The District of North Kesteven (Parishes and Electoral Changes) Order 1998 (S.I. 1998 No. 2338)
- The District of Wansbeck (Electoral Changes) Order 1998 (S.I. 1998 No. 2342)
- The District of Tynedale (Electoral Changes) Order 1998 (S.I. 1998 No. 2343)
- The Borough of Castle Morpeth (Electoral Changes) Order 1998 (S.I. 1998 No. 2344)
- The Borough of Blyth Valley (Electoral Changes) Order 1998 (S.I. 1998 No. 2345)
- The Borough of Berwick-upon-Tweed (Electoral Changes) Order 1998 (S.I. 1998 No. 2346)
- The District of Alnwick (Electoral Changes) Order 1998 (S.I. 1998 No. 2347)
- The Electricity (Non-Fossil Fuel Sources) (England and Wales) Order 1998 (S.I. 1998 No. 2353)
- The District of West Lindsey (Electoral Changes) Order 1998 (S.I. 1998 No. 2366)
- The Horse Passports (Amendment) Order 1998 (S.I. 1998 No. 2367)
- The Medicines (Pharmacy and General Sale—Exemption) Amendment (No. 2) Order 1998 (S.I. 1998 No. 2368)
- The Bank of England Act 1998 (Transfer Scheme Appointed Day) Order 1998 (S.I. 1998 No. 2372)
- The Railways (Ashford) (Exemptions) Order 1998 (S.I. 1998 No. 2379)
- The National Health Service Act 1977 and National Health Service (Scotland) Act 1978 Amendment Order 1998 (S.I. 1998 No. 2385)
- The Water Undertakers (Extension of Byelaws) Order 1998 (S.I. 1998 No. 2398)
- The Severn Trent Water Limited (Extension of Byelaws) Order 1998 (S.I. 1998 No. 2399)
- The County Courts (Interest on Judgment Debts) (Amendment) Order 1998 (S.I. 1998 No. 2400 (L.9))

== 2401–2500 ==
- The Legal Aid in Criminal and Care Proceedings (Costs) (Amendment) (No. 2) Regulations 1998 (S.I. 1998 No. 2401)
- The Reservoirs (Panels of Civil Engineers) (Applications and Fees) (Amendment) Regulations 1998 (S.I. 1998 No. 2403)
- The Specified Risk Material (Amendment) Regulations 1998 (S.I. 1998 No. 2405)
- The Pencils and Graphic Instruments (Safety) Regulations 1998 (S.I. 1998 No. 2406)
- The M41 West Cross Route (Holland Park Roundabout to A40(M)/M41 Junction Trunk Road) Order 1998 (S.I. 1998 No. 2407)
- The Prohibition of Keeping or Release of Live Fish (Specified Species) Order 1998 (S.I. 1998 No. 2409)
- The Olive Oil (Marketing Standards) (Amendment) Regulations 1998 (S.I. 1998 No. 2410)
- The Merchant Shipping and Fishing Vessels (Health and Safety at Work) (Employment of Young Persons) Regulations 1998 (S.I. 1998 No. 2411)
- The Crime and Disorder Act 1998 (Commencement No. 2 and Transitional Provisions) (Amendment) Order 1998 (S.I. 1998 No. 2412 (C. 55)])
- The National Health Service (Travelling Expenses and Remission of Charges) Amendment Regulations 1998 (S.I. 1998 No. 2417)
- The Drinking Milk Regulations 1998 (S.I. 1998 No. 2424)
- The A13 Trunk Road (Newham) (Temporary Prohibition of Traffic) Order 1998 (S.I. 1998 No. 2426)
- The A205 Trunk Road (Lewisham) Red Route (Prohibited Turns) Experimental Traffic Order 1998 (S.I. 1998 No. 2427)
- The Medicines (Products for Animal Use—Fees) Regulations 1998 (S.I. 1998 No. 2428)
- The Road Vehicles (Construction and Use) (Amendment) (No. 6) Regulations 1998 (S.I. 1998 No. 2429)
- The Specified Risk Material (Coming into Force Date) (Amendment) Regulations 1998 (S.I. 1998 No. 2431)
- The East Middlesbrough Education Action Zone (No. 2) Order 1998 (S.I. 1998 No. 2450)
- Gas Safety (Installation and Use) Regulations 1998 (S.I. 1998 No. 2451)
- The Crime and Disorder Strategies (Prescribed Descriptions) Order 1998 (S.I. 1998 No. 2452)
- The Housing Benefit (Recovery of Overpayments) Amendment Regulations 1998 (S.I. 1998 No. 2454)
- The Social Fund Cold Weather Payments (General) Amendment Regulations 1998 (S.I. 1998 No. 2455)
- The Rail Vehicle Accessibility Regulations 1998 (S.I. 1998 No. 2456)
- The Rail Vehicle (Exemption Applications) Regulations 1998 (S.I. 1998 No. 2457)
- The School Standards and Framework Act 1998 (Commencement No. 2 and Supplemental, Saving and Transitional Provisions) (Amendment) Order 1998 (S.I. 1998 No. 2459 (C.58)])
- The Cornwall and Isles of Scilly Health Authority (Transfers of Trust Property) Order 1998 (S.I. 1998 No. 2460)
- The Borough of Taunton Deane (Electoral Changes) Order 1998 (S.I. 1998 No. 2461)
- The District of South Somerset (Electoral Changes)Order 1998 (S.I. 1998 No. 2462)
- The District of West Somerset (Electoral Changes) Order 1998 (S.I. 1998 No. 2463)
- The District of Mendip (Electoral Changes) Order 1998 (S.I. 1998 No. 2464)
- The District of Sedgemoor (Electoral Changes) Order 1998 (S.I. 1998 No. 2465)
- The Local Government Act 1988 (Defined Activities) (Exemptions) (No. 3) Order 1998 (S.I. 1998 No. 2477)
- The Leeds Community and Mental Health Services Teaching National Health Service Trust (Establishment) Amendment (No. 2) Order 1998 (S.I. 1998 No. 2478)
- The Late Payment of Commercial Debts (Interest) Act 1998 (Commencement No. 1) Order 1998 (S.I. 1998 No. 2479 (C. 56)])
- The Late Payment of Commercial Debts (Rate of Interest) Order 1998 (S.I. 1998 No. 2480)
- The Late Payment of Commercial Debts (Interest) Act 1998 (Transitional Provisions) Regulations 1998 (S.I. 1998 No. 2481)
- The Late Payment of Commercial Debts (Interest) (Legal Aid Exceptions) Order 1998 (S.I. 1998 No. 2482)
- The Immigration (Transit Visa) (Amendment No. 3)Order 1998 (S.I. 1998 No. 2483)
- The Income Tax (Employments) (Amendment) Regulations 1998 (S.I. 1998 No. 2484)
- The East Yorkshire Hospitals National Health Service Trust (Establishment) Amendment Order 1998 (S.I. 1998 No. 2485)
- The Bromley Hospitals National Health Service Trust (Establishment) Amendment (No. 2) Order 1998 (S.I. 1998 No. 2486)
- The District of South Hams (Electoral Changes) Order 1998 (S.I. 1998 No. 2487)
- The Water Undertakers (Extension of Byelaws) (No. 2) Order 1998 (S.I. 1998 No. 2489)
- Welsh Development Agency (Membership) Order 1998 (S.I. 1998 No. 2490)

== 2501–2600 ==
- The London Borough of Lewisham (Trunk Roads) Red Route (Bus Lanes) Traffic Order 1998 (S.I. 1998 No. 2502)
- The Prisons and Young Offenders Institutions (Scotland) Amendment (No.2) Rules 1998 (S.I. 1998 No. 2504 (S.123)])
- The Exchange of Securities (General) (Amendment) Rules 1998 (S.I. 1998 No. 2505)
- The Borough of Corby (Electoral Changes) Order 1998 (S.I. 1998 No. 2506)
- The District of Daventry (Electoral Changes) Order 1998 (S.I. 1998 No. 2507)
- The Borough of Kettering (Electoral Changes) Order 1998 (S.I. 1998 No. 2508)
- The District of South Northamptonshire (Electoral Changes) Order 1998 (S.I. 1998 No. 2509)
- The Borough of Wellingborough (Electoral Changes) Order 1998 (S.I. 1998 No. 2510)
- The Borough of Northampton (Electoral Changes) Order 1998 (S.I. 1998 No. 2511)
- The District of East Northamptonshire (Electoral Changes) Order 1998 (S.I. 1998 No. 2512)
- The Crime and Disorder Strategies (Prescribed Descriptions) (Amendment) Order 1998 (S.I. 1998 No. 2513)
- The Merchant Shipping (Passenger Ship Construction: Ships of Classes I, II and II(A)) Regulations 1998 (S.I. 1998 No. 2514)
- The Merchant Shipping (Passenger Ship Construction: Ships of Classes III to VI(A)) Regulations 1998 (S.I. 1998 No. 2515)
- The A417 Trunk Road (Daglingworth Quarry Junction) (Detrunking) Order 1998 (S.I. 1998 No. 2517)
- The A419 Trunk Road (Latton Bypass and Slip Roads) (Detrunking) Order 1998 (S.I. 1998 No. 2518)
- The European Parliamentary Elections (Day of By-election) (North East Scotland Constituency) Order 1998 (S.I. 1998 No. 2522)
- The Education (School Information) (England) Regulations 1998 (S.I. 1998 No. 2526)
- The Judicial Pensions (Transfer Between Judicial Pension Schemes) (Amendment) Regulations 1998 (S.I. 1998 No. 2527)
- The Wireless Telegraphy (Citizens' Band and Amateur Apparatus) (Various Provisions) Order 1998 (S.I. 1998 No. 2531)
- The Local Government etc. (Scotland) Act 1994 (Commencement No.8) Order 1998 (S.I. 1998 No. 2532 (C. 57) (S. 124)])
- The Trade Effluent (Registers) (Scotland) Regulations 1998 (S.I. 1998 No. 2533 (S. 125)])
- The Religious Character of Schools (Designation Procedure) Regulations 1998 (S.I. 1998 No. 2535)
- The Air Navigation (Dangerous Goods) (Third Amendment) Regulations 1998 (S.I. 1998 No. 2536)
- The Welfare of Animals (Staging Points) Order 1998 (S.I. 1998 No. 2537)
- The Spreadable Fats (Marketing Standards) (Amendment) (No. 2) Regulations 1998 (S.I. 1998 No. 2538)
- The A4 Trunk Road (Concorde Roundabout, Hillingdon) (Prohibitions On The Northern Carriageway) Order 1998 (S.I. 1998 No. 2539)
- The A4 Trunk Road (Hounslow) Red Route (Clearway) Traffic Order 1996 Variation (No. 2) Order 1998 (S.I. 1998 No. 2545)
- The District of Eden (Electoral Changes) Order 1998 (S.I. 1998 No. 2547)
- The District of South Lakeland (Electoral Changes) Order 1998 (S.I. 1998 No. 2548)
- The City of Carlisle (Electoral Changes) Order 1998 (S.I. 1998 No. 2549)
- The Local Government Act 1988 (Defined Activities) (Exemption) (Leicester City Council) Order 1998 (S.I. 1998 No. 2550)
- The Borough of Broxbourne (Electoral Changes) Order 1998 (S.I. 1998 No. 2551)
- The Borough of Dacorum (Electoral Changes) Order 1998 (S.I. 1998 No. 2552)
- The District of East Hertfordshire (Electoral Changes) Order 1998 (S.I. 1998 No. 2553)
- The Borough of Hertsmere (Electoral Changes) Order 1998 (S.I. 1998 No. 2554)
- The District of North Hertfordshire (Electoral Changes) Order 1998 (S.I. 1998 No. 2555)
- The District of Three Rivers (Parishes and Electoral Changes) Order 1998 (S.I. 1998 No. 2556)
- The Borough of Stevenage (Electoral Changes) Order 1998 (S.I. 1998 No. 2557)
- The City of St Albans (Electoral Changes) Order 1998 (S.I. 1998 No. 2558)
- The Borough of Watford (Electoral Changes) Order 1998 (S.I. 1998 No. 2559)
- The District of Welwyn Hatfield (Electoral Changes) Order 1998 (S.I. 1998 No. 2560)
- The Building Regulations (Amendment) Regulations 1998 (S.I. 1998 No. 2561)
- The Carriage by Air and Road Act 1979 (Commencement No. 3) Order 1998 (S.I. 1998 No. 2562 (C.59)])
- Outer Space Act 1986 (Cayman Islands) Order 1998 (S.I. 1998 No. 2563)
- The Territorial Sea (Amendment) Order 1998 (S.I. 1998 No. 2564)
- The Chemical Weapons Act 1996 (Jersey) Order 1998 (S.I. 1998 No. 2565)
- The Double Taxation Relief (Air Transport) (Hong Kong) Order 1998 (S.I. 1998 No. 2566)
- The Double Taxation Relief (Taxes on Income) (Kazakhstan) Order 1998 (S.I. 1998 No. 2567)
- The Double Taxation Relief (Taxes on Income) (Oman) Order 1998 (S.I. 1998 No. 2568)
- The Borough of Allerdale (Electoral Changes) Order 1998 (S.I. 1998 No. 2569)
- The Borough of Copeland (Electoral Changes) Order 1998 (S.I. 1998 No. 2570)
- The Borough of Barrow-in-Furness (Electoral Changes) Order 1998 (S.I. 1998 No. 2571)
- The Family Law Act 1996 (Commencement) (No. 3) Order 1998 (S.I. 1998 No. 2572 (C. 60)])
- The Employers' Liability (Compulsory Insurance) Regulations 1998 (S.I. 1998 No. 2573)
- The National Minimum Wage Act 1998 (Commencement No. 1 and Transitional Provisions) Order 1998 (S.I. 1998 No. 2574 (C.61)])
- The Civil Aviation (Canadian Navigation Services) Regulations 1998 (S.I. 1998 No. 2575)
- The Education (National Curriculum) (Attainment Targets and Programmes of Study in Welsh) (Amendment) Order 1998 (S.I. 1998 No. 2576)
- The A3 Trunk Road (Wandsworth High Street) (Bus Bay Clearway) Order 1998 (S.I. 1998 No. 2591)

== 2601–2700 ==
- The A4 Trunk Road (Hillingdon) Red Route (Clearway) Traffic Order 1996 Variation Order 1998 (S.I. 1998 No. 2611)
- The A316 Trunk Road (Hounslow) Red Route Traffic Order 1998 (S.I. 1998 No. 2615)
- The Local Government Act 1988 (Defined Activities) (Exemption) (Rugby Borough Council) Order 1998 (S.I. 1998 No. 2616)
- The Disability Discrimination (Exemption for Small Employers) Order 1998 (S.I. 1998 No. 2618)
- The Local Government Act 1988 (Defined Activities) (Exemption) (Easington District Council) Order 1998 (S.I. 1998 No. 2619)
- The Finance Act 1995, Section 139(3), (Appointed Day) Order 1998 (S.I. 1998 No. 2620 (C. 62)])
- The Health Authorities (Membership and Procedure) Amendment Regulations 1998 (S.I. 1998 No. 2621)
- The Income Tax (Sub-contractors in the Construction Industry) (Amendment) Regulations 1998 (S.I. 1998 No. 2622)
- The Nurses, Midwives and Health Visitors (Miscellaneous Amendments) Order 1998 (S.I. 1998 No. 2623)
- The Mental Health (Hospital, Guardianship and Consent to Treatment) Amendment Regulations 1998 (S.I. 1998 No. 2624)
- The Mental Health (Nurses) Order 1998 (S.I. 1998 No. 2625)
- Act of Adjournal (Extension of Time Limit for Service of Transcript of Examination) 1998 (S.I. 1998 No. 2635 (S.126)])
- Act of Sederunt (Messengers-at-Arms and Sheriff Officers Rules) (Amendment) 1998 (S.I. 1998 No. 2636 (S.127)])
- Act of Sederunt (Rules of the Court of Session Amendment No. 2) (Miscellaneous) 1998 (S.I. 1998 No. 2637 (S. 128)])
- The Broadford Bay and Loch Ainort, Isle of Skye, Scallops Several Fishery Order 1998 (S.I. 1998 No. 2638 (S.129)])
- The Scalpay Island, Isle of Skye, Scallops Several Fishery Order 1998 (S.I. 1998 No. 2639 (S.130)])
- The Loch Sligachan, Isle of Skye, Scallops Several Fishery Order 1998 (S.I. 1998 No. 2640 (S.131)])
- The A19 Trunk Road (Wolviston Interchange, Southbound Exit Slip Road) (Trunking) Order 1998 (S.I. 1998 No. 2641)
- The Merchant Shipping (Carriage of Nautical Publications) Regulations 1998 (S.I. 1998 No. 2647)
- The Nurses, Midwives and Health Visitors (Midwives Amendment) Rules Approval Order 1998 (S.I. 1998 No. 2649)
- The Magistrates' Courts Committees (Dyfed and Powys) Amalgamation Order 1998 (S.I. 1998 No. 2664)
- The Dudley Priority Health National Health Service Trust (Establishment) Amendment Order 1998 (S.I. 1998 No. 2667)
- Act of Sederunt (Fees of Messengers-at-Arms) 1998 (S.I. 1998 No. 2668 (S.132)])
- Act of Sederunt (Fees of Sheriff Officers) 1998 (S.I. 1998 No. 2669 (S.133)])
- The School Standards and Framework Act 1998 (Modification) Regulations 1998 (S.I. 1998 No. 2670)
- Act of Sederunt (Rules of the Court of Session Amendment No. 3 ) (Fees of Solicitors) 1998 (S.I. 1998 No. 2674 (S.134)])
- Act of Sederunt (Fees of Solicitors in the Sheriff Court) (Amendment) 1998 (S.I. 1998 No. 2675 (S. 135)])
- The Magistrates' Courts (Sex Offender and Anti-social Behaviour Orders) Rules 1998 (S.I. 1998 No. 2682 (L. 10)])
- The General Osteopathic Council (Conditional Registration) (Amendment) Rules Order of Council 1998 (S.I. 1998 No. 2695)
- The Friendly Societies (Activities of a Subsidiary) (No. 2) Order 1998 (S.I. 1998 No. 2696)
- The Education (School Information) (Wales) (Amendment) Regulations 1998 (S.I. 1998 No. 2697)
- The Education (Grants for Education Support and Training) (England) Regulations 1998 (Amendment) (No. 2) Regulations 1998 (S.I. 1998 No. 2698)
- The City of Bristol (Electoral Changes) Order 1998 (S.I. 1998 No. 2699)
- The District of Bath and North East Somerset (Electoral Changes) Order 1998 (S.I. 1998 No. 2700)

== 2701–2800 ==
- The District of South Gloucestershire (Electoral Changes) Order 1998 (S.I. 1998 No. 2701)
- The District of North Somerset (Electoral Changes) Order 1998 (S.I. 1998 No. 2702)
- The Finance Act 1998, Section 145, (Appointed Day) Order 1998 (S.I. 1998 No. 2703 (C. 63)])
- The Income Tax (Indexation) (No. 2) Order 1998 (S.I. 1998 No. 2704)
- The Education (Individual Pupils' Achievements) (Information) (Wales) (Amendment) Regulations 1998 (S.I. 1998 No. 2705)
- The Magistrates' Courts Committees (Northumbria) Amalgamation Order 1998 (S.I. 1998 No. 2707)
- The Protection of Wrecks (Designation No. 2) Order 1998 (S.I. 1998 No. 2708)
- The Borders Primary Care National Health Service Trust (Establishment) Order 1998 (S.I. 1998 No. 2709 (S. 136)])
- The Tayside Primary Care National Health Service Trust (Establishment) Order 1998 (S.I. 1998 No. 2710 (S. 137)])
- The Lothian Primary Care National Health Service Trust (Establishment) Order 1998 (S.I. 1998 No. 2711 (S. 138)])
- The Fife Primary Care National Health Service Trust (Establishment) Order 1998 (S.I. 1998 No. 2712 (S. 139)])
- The Forth Valley Primary Care National Health Service Trust (Establishment) Order 1998 (S.I. 1998 No. 2713 (S. 140)])
- The Dumfries and Galloway Primary Care National Health Service Trust (Establishment) Order 1998 (S.I. 1998 No. 2714 (S. 141)])
- The Ayrshire and Arran Primary Care National Health Service Trust (Establishment) Order 1998 (S.I. 1998 No. 2715 (S. 142)])
- The Argyll and Clyde Acute Hospitals National Health Service Trust (Establishment) Order 1998 (S.I. 1998 No. 2716 (S. 143)])
- The Lothian University Hospitals National Health Service Trust (Establishment) Order 1998 (S.I. 1998 No. 2717 (S. 144)])
- The Grampian University Hospitals National Health Service Trust (Establishment) Order 1998 (S.I. 1998 No. 2718 (S. 145)])
- The Greater Glasgow Primary Care National Health Service Trust (Establishment) Order 1998 (S.I. 1998 No. 2719 (S. 146)])
- The Grampian Primary Care National Health Service Trust (Establishment) Order 1998 (S.I. 1998 No. 2720 (S. 147)])
- The Highland Primary Care National Health Service Trust (Establishment) Order 1998 (S.I. 1998 No. 2721 (S. 148)])
- The Highland Acute Hospitals National Health Service Trust (Establishment) Order 1998 (S.I. 1998 No. 2722 (S. 149)])
- The Fife Acute Hospitals National Health Service Trust (Establishment) Order 1998 (S.I. 1998 No. 2723 (S. 150)])
- The Lanarkshire Acute Hospitals National Health Service Trust (Establishment) Order 1998 (S.I. 1998 No. 2724 (S. 151)])
- The Forth Valley Acute Hospitals National Health Service Trust (Establishment) Order 1998 (S.I. 1998 No. 2725 (S. 152)])
- The Seeds (National Lists of Varieties) (Amendment) Regulations 1998 (S.I. 1998 No. 2726)
- The Legal Advice and Assistance (Amendment) (No. 2) Regulations 1998 (S.I. 1998 No. 2727)
- The Tayside University Hospitals National Health Service Trust (Establishment) Order 1998 (S.I. 1998 No. 2728 (S. 153)])
- The North Glasgow University Hospitals National Health Service Trust (Establishment) Order 1998 (S.I. 1998 No. 2729 (S. 154)])
- The South Glasgow University Hospitals National Health Service Trust (Establishment) Order 1998 (S.I. 1998 No. 2730 (S. 155)])
- The West Lothian Healthcare National Health Service Trust (Establishment) Order 1998 (S.I. 1998 No. 2731 (S. 156)])
- The Lanarkshire Primary Care National Health Service Trust (Establishment) Order 1998 (S.I. 1998 No. 2732 (S. 157)])
- The Renfrewshire and Inverclyde Primary Care National Health Service Trust (Establishment) Order 1998 (S.I. 1998 No. 2733 (S. 158)])
- The Lomond and Argyll Primary Care National Health Service Trust (Establishment) Order 1998 (S.I. 1998 No. 2734 (S. 159)])
- The Ayrshire and Arran Acute Hospitals National Health Service Trust (Establishment) Order 1998 (S.I. 1998 No. 2735 (S. 160)])
- The A205 Trunk Road (Lewisham) Red Route Experimental Traffic Order 1998 (S.I. 1998 No. 2745)
- The Groundwater Regulations 1998 (S.I. 1998 No. 2746)
- The Competition Act 1998 (Commencement No. 1) Order 1998 (S.I. 1998 No. 2750 (C.64)])
- The Plant Protection Products (Amendment) Regulations 1998 (S.I. 1998 No. 2760)
- The Local Government Act 1988 (Defined Activities) (Exemption) (Tendring District Council) Order 1998 (S.I. 1998 No. 2762)
- The Education (School Government) (Transition to New Framework) Regulations 1998 (S.I. 1998 No. 2763)
- The Late Payment of Commercial Debts (Rate of Interest) (No. 2) Order 1998 (S.I. 1998 No. 2765)
- The Co-operation of Insolvency Courts (Designation of Relevant Country) Order 1998 (S.I. 1998 No. 2766)
- The Value Added Tax (Input Tax) (Amendment) Order 1998 (S.I. 1998 No. 2767)
- The Judicial Pensions (European Court of Human Rights) Order 1998 (S.I. 1998 No. 2768)
- The Magistrates' Courts Committees (West Yorkshire) Amalgamation Order 1998 (S.I. 1998 No. 2769)
- The Limit in Relation to Provision of Digital Programme Services Order 1998 (S.I. 1998 No. 2770)
- The Merchant Shipping (Vessels in Commercial Use for Sport or Pleasure) Regulations 1998 (S.I. 1998 No. 2771)
- The National Health Service (Travelling Expenses and Remission of Charges) (Scotland) Amendment Regulations 1998 (S.I. 1998 No. 2772 (S.161)])
- The Social Security Administration (Fraud) Act 1997 (Commencement No. 6) Order 1998 (S.I. 1998 No. 2779 (C.65)])
- The Social Security Act 1998 (Commencement No. 2) Order 1998 (S.I. 1998 No. 2780 (C.66)])
- The Government of Wales Act 1998 (Commencement No. 2) Order 1998 (S.I. 1998 No. 2789 (C.67)])
- The Bethlem and Maudsley National Health Service Trust (Transfer of Trust Property) Order 1998 (S.I. 1998 No. 2790)
- The School Standards and Framework Act 1998 (Commencement No. 3 and Saving and Transitional Provisions) Order 1998 (S.I. 1998 No. 2791 (C. 68)])
- The Education (Schools and Further Education) (Amendment) Regulations 1998 (S.I. 1998 No. 2792)
- The European Communities (Designation) (No. 3) Order 1998 (S.I. 1998 No. 2793)
- The Chemical Weapons Act 1996 (Isle of Man) Order 1998 (S.I. 1998 No. 2794)
- Health and Safety at Work (Amendment) (Northern Ireland) Order 1998 (S.I. 1998 No. 2795 (N.I. 18)])
- Local Government (Amendment) (Northern Ireland) Order 1998 (S.I. 1998 No. 2796 (N.I. 19)])
- The Transfer of Prisoners (Isle of Man) (Amendment) Order 1998 (S.I. 1998 No. 2797)
- The Transfer of Prisoners (Restricted Transfers) (Channel Islands and Isle of Man) Order 1998 (S.I. 1998 No. 2798)
- The Child Support (Miscellaneous Amendments) (No. 2) Regulations 1998 (S.I. 1998 No. 2799)
- The Town and Country Planning General (Amendment) Regulations 1998 (S.I. 1998 No. 2800)

== 2801–2900 ==
- The Edinburgh Healthcare National Health Service Trust (Establishment) Amendment Order 1998 (S.I. 1998 No. 2802 (S. 162)])
- The Perth and Kinross (Electoral Arrangements) Order 1998 (S.I. 1998 No. 2803 (S. 163)])
- The East Lothian (Electoral Arrangements) Order 1998 (S.I. 1998 No. 2804 (S. 164)])
- The Angus (Electoral Arrangements) Order 1998 (S.I. 1998 No. 2806 (S. 165)])
- The Social Security (New Deal Pilot) Regulations 1998 (S.I. 1998 No. 2825)
- The Legal Advice and Assistance (Scope) (Amendment) Regulations 1998 (S.I. 1998 No. 2831)
- The School Standards and Framework Act 1998 (Home–School Agreements) (Modification) Regulations 1998 (S.I. 1998 No. 2834)
- The Building Societies Act 1997 (Expiry of Transitional Period) Order 1998 (S.I. 1998 No. 2835)
- The Non-Domestic Rating (Rural Settlements) (England) (No. 2) Order 1998 (S.I. 1998 No. 2836)
- The London Ambulance Service National Health Service Trust (Establishment) Amendment Order 1998 (S.I. 1998 No. 2837)
- The National Health Service (General Medical Services) Amendment (No. 2) Regulations 1998 (S.I. 1998 No. 2838)
- The Criminal Justice (Northern Ireland) Order 1998 (S.I. 1998 No. 2839 (N.I. 20)])
- The National Health Service (Primary Care) Act 1997 (Commencement No. 6) Order 1998 (S.I. 1998 No. 2840 (C.69)])
- The Hereford and Worcester Ambulance Service National Health Service Trust (Establishment) Amendment Order 1998 (S.I. 1998 No. 2841)
- The Contracting Out (Functions in Relation to Insurance) Order 1998 (S.I. 1998 No. 2842)
- The Borough of Congleton (Electoral Changes) Order 1998 (S.I. 1998 No. 2843)
- The Borough of Ellesmere Port & Neston (Electoral Changes) Order 1998 (S.I. 1998 No. 2844)
- The Borough of Crewe and Nantwich (Electoral Changes) Order 1998 (S.I. 1998 No. 2845)
- The Borough of Vale Royal (Electoral Changes) Order 1998 (S.I. 1998 No. 2846)
- The Borough of Macclesfield (Electoral Changes) Order 1998 (S.I. 1998 No. 2847)
- The Merchant Shipping and Fishing Vessels (Manual Handling Operations) Regulations 1998 (S.I. 1998 No. 2857)
- The Residuary Body for Wales (Winding Up) Order 1998 (S.I. 1998 No. 2859)
- The Local Government Act 1988 (Defined Activities) (Exemption) (Christchurch Borough Council and Purbeck District Council) Order 1998 (S.I. 1998 No. 2862)
- The Fees for Inquiries (Standard Daily Amount) Regulations 1998 (S.I. 1998 No. 2864)
- The Income-related Benefits (Subsidy to Authorities) Amendment Order 1998 (S.I. 1998 No. 2865)
- The City of Chester (Electoral Changes) Order 1998 (S.I. 1998 No. 2866)
- The Herring (Specified Sea Areas) (Prohibition of Fishing) Order 1998 (S.I. 1998 No. 2867)
- The Commercial Agents (Council Directive) (Amendment) Regulations 1998 (S.I. 1998 No. 2868)
- The Northern Ireland (Sentences) Act 1998 (Specified Organisations) (No. 2) Order 1998 (S.I. 1998 No. 2869)
- The Representation of the People (Northern Ireland) (Amendment) Regulations 1998 (S.I. 1998 No. 2870)
- The North Hull Housing Action Trust (Dissolution) Order 1998 (S.I. 1998 No. 2871)
- The Registration of Political Parties (Fees) Order 1998 (S.I. 1998 No. 2872)
- The Registration of Political Parties (Prohibited Words and Expressions) Order 1998 (S.I. 1998 No. 2873)
- The Jobseeker's Allowance Amendment (New Deal) Regulations 1998 (S.I. 1998 No. 2874)
- The Registration of Political Parties (Access to the Register) Regulations 1998 (S.I. 1998 No. 2875)
- The Education (Grammar School Ballots) Regulations 1998 (S.I. 1998 No. 2876)
- The School Standards and Framework Act 1998 (Home–School Agreements) (Appointed Day) Order 1998 (S.I. 1998 No. 2877 (C.70)])
- The Income Support (General) (Standard Interest Rate Amendment) (No. 2) Regulations 1998 (S.I. 1998 No. 2878)
- The Charges for Inspections and Controls (Amendment) Regulations 1998 (S.I. 1998 No. 2880)
- The Human Rights Act 1998 (Commencement) Order 1998 (S.I. 1998 No. 2882 (C.71)])
- The Charities (Royal Russell School) Order 1998 (S.I. 1998 No. 2883)
- The Motor Vehicles (Authorisation of Special Types) (Amendment) (No. 2) Order 1998 (S.I. 1998 No. 2884)
- The Carriage of Dangerous Goods (Amendment) Regulations 1998 (S.I. 1998 No. 2885)
- The Further and Higher Education (Scotland) Act 1992 (Commencement No.2) Order 1998 (S.I. 1998 No. 2886 (C.72) (S.166)])
- The Scottish Further Education Funding Council (Establishment) (Scotland) Order 1998 (S.I. 1998 No. 2887 (S.167)])
- The Local Government Pension Scheme (Management and Investment of Funds) (Scotland) Regulations 1998 (S.I. 1998 No. 2888 (S.168)])
- The Social Security (Contributions)Amendment (No. 5) Regulations 1998 (S.I. 1998 No. 2894)

== 2901–3000 ==
- The Crime and Disorder Act 1998 (Commencement No. 2 and Transitional Provisions) (Amendment) (No. 2) Order 1998 (S.I. 1998 No. 2906 (C.73)])
- The Legal Advice and Assistance (Amendment) (No. 3) Regulations 1998 (S.I. 1998 No. 2907)
- The Legal Aid in Criminal and Care Proceedings (Costs) (Amendment) (No. 3) Regulations 1998 (S.I. 1998 No. 2908)
- The Legal Aid in Criminal and Care Proceedings (General) (Amendment) (No. 2) Regulations 1998 (S.I. 1998 No. 2909)
- The Civil Courts (Amendment) (No. 2) Order 1998 (S.I. 1998 No. 2910)
- The General Teaching Council for Wales Order 1998 (S.I. 1998 No. 2911)
- The Swansea–Manchester Trunk Road (A483) (Llandovery County Primary School Layby Detrunking) Order 1998 (S.I. 1998 No. 2912)
- The Town and Country Planning (Minerals) (Scotland) Regulations 1998 (S.I. 1998 No. 2913 (S. 169)])
- The Town and Country Planning (Compensation for Restrictions on Mineral Working and Mineral Waste Depositing) (Scotland) Regulations 1998 (S.I. 1998 No. 2914 (S. 170)])
- The Channel 4 (Application of Excess Revenues) Order 1998 (S.I. 1998 No. 2915)
- The School Standards and Framework Act 1998 (Allowances for Governors and Individual Pupil Information) (Modification) Regulations 1998 (S.I. 1998 No. 2916)
- The Carriage of Passengers and their Luggage by Sea (United Kingdom Carriers) Order 1998 (S.I. 1998 No. 2917)
- The Airports (Groundhandling) (Amendment) Regulations 1998 (S.I. 1998 No. 2918)
- The Greater Manchester (Light Rapid Transit System) (Land Acquisition) Order 1998 (S.I. 1998 No. 2919)
- The Life Assurance (Apportionment of Receipts of Participating Funds) (Applicable Percentage) (Amendment) Order 1998 (S.I. 1998 No. 2920)
- The Occupational Pensions (Revaluation) Order 1998 (S.I. 1998 No. 2921)
- The Pesticides (Maximum Residue Levels in Crops, Food and Feeding Stuffs) (Amendment) Regulations 1998 (S.I. 1998 No. 2922)
- The Chichester Priority Care Services National Health Service Trust (Change of Name) Order 1998 (S.I. 1998 No. 2923)
- The Action Programme for Nitrate Vulnerable Zones (Scotland) Regulations 1998 (S.I. 1998 No. 2927 (S. 171)])
- The Civil Procedure (Modification of Enactments) Order 1998 (S.I. 1998 No. 2940)
- The Queen's Medical Centre, Nottingham, University Hospital National Health Service Trust (Establishment) Amendment Order 1998 (S.I. 1998 No. 2947)
- The Herefordshire Community Health National Health Service Trust (Establishment) Amendment Order 1998 (S.I. 1998 No. 2948)
- The Warwickshire Ambulance Service National Health Service Trust (Establishment) Amendment Order 1998 (S.I. 1998 No. 2949)
- The South Tees Acute Hospitals National Health Service Trust (Establishment) Amendment Order 1998 (S.I. 1998 No. 2950)
- The Regional Development Agencies Act 1998 (Commencement No. 1) Order 1998 (S.I. 1998 No. 2952 (C.74)])
- The Dissolution of the Broadcasting Complaints Commission and the Broadcasting Standards Council Order 1998 (S.I. 1998 No. 2954)
- The Local Government Act 1988 (Defined Activities) (Exemption) (Lichfield District Council) Order 1998 (S.I. 1998 No. 2955)
- The Local Authorities (Goods and Services) (Public Bodies) (No. 5) Order 1998 (S.I. 1998 No. 2956)
- The Non-Domestic Rating Contributions (Scotland) Amendment Regulations 1998 (S.I. 1998 No. 2957 (S. 172)])
- The Severn Bridges Tolls Order 1998 (S.I. 1998 No. 2958)
- The Non-Domestic Rating Contributions (Wales) (Amendment) Regulations 1998 (S.I. 1998 No. 2962)
- The Non-Domestic Rating (Rural Settlements) (Wales) Order 1998 (S.I. 1998 No. 2963)
- The Riverside Mental Health, the North West London Mental Health and the West London Healthcare National Health Service Trusts (Dissolution) Order 1998 (S.I. 1998 No. 2964)
- The Ealing, Hammersmith and Fulham Mental Health National Health Service Trust (Establishment) Order 1998 (S.I. 1998 No. 2965)
- The Brent, Kensington & Chelsea and Westminster Mental Health National Health Service Trust (Establishment) Order 1998 (S.I. 1998 No. 2966)
- The Afan College (Dissolution) Order 1998 (S.I. 1998 No. 2967)
- The Cattle Identification (Amendment) Regulations 1998 (S.I. 1998 No. 2969)
- The Wireless Telegraphy (Visiting Ships and Aircraft) Regulations 1998 (S.I. 1998 No. 2970)
- The Electricity Supply (Amendment) Regulations 1998 (S.I. 1998 No. 2971)
- The North Staffordshire Combined Healthcare National Health Service Trust (Establishment) Amendment Order 1998 (S.I. 1998 No. 2972)
- The Statistics of Trade (Customs and Excise) (Amendment) Regulations 1998 (S.I. 1998 No. 2973)
- The Land Registration (District Registries) (No. 2) Order 1998 (S.I. 1998 No. 2974)
- The Civil Aviation (Navigation Services Charges) (Amendment) Regulations 1998 (S.I. 1998 No. 2975)
- The Merchant Shipping (Registration of Ships) (Amendment) Regulations 1998 (S.I. 1998 No. 2976)
- The Hallmarking (Hallmarking Act Amendment) Regulations 1998 (S.I. 1998 No. 2978)
- The Hallmarking (Hallmarking Act Amendment) Order 1998 (S.I. 1998 No. 2979)
- The Land Registration (Scotland) Act 1979 (Commencement No.12) Order 1998 (S.I. 1998 No. 2980 (C. 75) (S. 173)])
- The Frenchay Healthcare National Health Service Trust (Establishment) Amendment Order 1998 (S.I. 1998 No. 2993)
- The Non-automatic Weighing Instruments (EEC Requirements) (Amendment) Regulations 1998 (S.I. 1998 No. 2994)
- The Revenue Support Grant (Specified Bodies) (Amendment) Regulations 1998 (S.I. 1998 No. 2995)
- The Insurance Companies (Amendment) Regulations 1998 (S.I. 1998 No. 2996)
- The Housing (Right to Buy) (Limits on Discount) Order 1998 (S.I. 1998 No. 2997)
- The Home Repair Assistance (Extension) Regulations 1998 (S.I. 1998 No. 2998)
- The Civil Aviation (Route Charges for Navigation Services) (Second Amendment) Regulations 1998 (S.I. 1998 No. 2999)
- The Civil Aviation (Joint Financing) (Amendment) Regulations 1998 (S.I. 1998 No. 3000)

== 3001–3100 ==
- The Public Telecommunication System Designation (NETs Limited) Order 1998 (S.I. 1998 No. 3001)
- The Public Telecommunication System Designation (Data Marine Systems Limited) Order 1998 (S.I. 1998 No. 3002)
- The Public Telecommunication System Designation (PT–1 Communications UK Limited) Order 1998 (S.I. 1998 No. 3003)
- The Public Telecommunication System Designation (Ibercom Limited) Order 1998 (S.I. 1998 No. 3004)
- The Public Telecommunication System Designation (Storm Telecommunications Limited) Order 1998 (S.I. 1998 No. 3005)
- The Public Telecommunication System Designation (Worldport Communications Limited) Order 1998 (S.I. 1998 No. 3006)
- The Public Telecommunication System Designation (KPN Telecom UK Limited) Order 1998 (S.I. 1998 No. 3007)
- The Public Telecommunication System Designation (Cignal Global Communications U.K. Limited) Order 1998 (S.I. 1998 No. 3008)
- The Public Telecommunication System Designation (Viatel UK Limited) Order 1998 (S.I. 1998 No. 3009)
- The Public Telecommunication System Designation (Teleport London International Limited) Order 1998 (S.I. 1998 No. 3010)
- The Public Telecommunication System Designation (Internet Network Services Limited) Order 1998 (S.I. 1998 No. 3011)
- The Public Telecommunication System Designation (MLL Telecom Limited) Order 1998 (S.I. 1998 No. 3012)
- The Public Telecommunication System Designation (International Computers Limited) Order 1998 (S.I. 1998 No. 3013)
- The Public Telecommunication System Designation (Qwest Communications International Limited) Order 1998 (S.I. 1998 No. 3014)
- The Public Telecommunication System Designation (Witley Communications Limited) Order 1998 (S.I. 1998 No. 3015)
- The Public Telecommunication System Designation (International Telecommunications Group Inc) Order 1998 (S.I. 1998 No. 3016)
- The Public Telecommunication System Designation (EGN BV) Order 1998 (S.I. 1998 No. 3017)
- The Public Telecommunication System Designation (The JNT Association) Order 1998 (S.I. 1998 No. 3018)
- The Public Telecommunication System Designation (NorSea Com A/S) Order 1998 (S.I. 1998 No. 3019)
- The Public Telecommunication System Designation (Telecom One Limited) Order 1998 (S.I. 1998 No. 3020)
- The Public Telecommunication System Designation (International Telecom Plc) Order 1998 (S.I. 1998 No. 3021)
- The Public Telecommunication System Designation (UTG Communications (Europe) AG) Order 1998 (S.I. 1998 No. 3022)
- The Public Telecommunication System Designation (VersaTel Telecom BV) Order 1998 (S.I. 1998 No. 3023)
- The County Court (Forms) (Amendment No. 2) Rules 1998 (S.I. 1998 No. 3024 (L.11)])
- The Special Trustees for Newcastle University Hospital (Transfer of Trust Property) Order 1998 (S.I. 1998 No. 3028)
- The Superannuation (Admission to Schedule 1 to the Superannuation Act 1972) (No. 3) Order 1998 (S.I. 1998 No. 3030)
- The National Health Service (Pharmaceutical Services) (Scotland) Amendment Regulations 1998 (S.I. 1998 No. 3031 (S. 174)])
- The Friendly Societies (Insurance Business) (Amendment) Regulations 1998 (S.I. 1998 No. 3034)
- The Industry Act 1975 (Prohibition and Vesting Order) Regulations 1998 (S.I. 1998 No. 3035)
- The Wireless Telegraphy Appeal Tribunal Rules 1998 (S.I. 1998 No. 3036)
- The Prosecution of Offences (Custody Time Limits) (Modification) Regulations 1998 (S.I. 1998 No. 3037)
- The Non-Domestic Rating Contributions (England) (Amendment) Regulations 1998 (S.I. 1998 No. 3038)
- The Social Security (Claims and Payments) Amendment (No. 2) Regulations 1998 (S.I. 1998 No. 3039)
- The Indictments (Procedure) (Modification) Rules 1998 (S.I. 1998 No. 3045 (L. 12)])
- The Magistrates' Courts (Modification) Rules 1998 (S.I. 1998 No. 3046 (L. 13)])
- The Crown Court (Modification) Rules 1998 (S.I. 1998 No. 3047 (L.14)])
- The Crime and Disorder Act 1998 (Dismissal of Charges Sent) Rules 1998 (S.I. 1998 No. 3048 (L.15)])
- The Rules of the Supreme Court (Amendment No. 2) 1998 (S.I. 1998 No. 3049 (L. 16)])
- The Consumer Protection (Cancellation of Contracts Concluded away from Business Premises) (Amendment) Regulations 1998 (S.I. 1998 No. 3050)
- The Grants for Improvements in School Education (Scotland) Regulations 1998 (S.I. 1998 No. 3051 (S. 175)])
- The National Health Service (Choice of Dental Practitioner) (Scotland) Amendment Regulations 1998 (S.I. 1998 No. 3052 (S. 176)])
- The Local Government Act 1988 (Defined Activities) (Exemption) (Poole Borough Council) Order 1998 (S.I. 1998 No. 3053)
- The East Brighton Education Action Zone Order 1998 (S.I. 1998 No. 3054)
- The Thetford Education Action Zone Order 1998 (S.I. 1998 No. 3055)
- The Leigh Education Action Zone Order 1998 (S.I. 1998 No. 3056)
- The North Southwark Education Action Zone Order 1998 (S.I. 1998 No. 3057)
- The South Tyneside Education Action Zone Order 1998 (S.I. 1998 No. 3058)
- The North East Sheffield Education Action Zone Order 1998 (S.I. 1998 No. 3059)
- The Plymouth Education Action Zone Order 1998 (S.I. 1998 No. 3060)
- The Nottingham (Bulwell) Education Action Zone Order 1998 (S.I. 1998 No. 3061)
- The Birmingham (Kitts Green and Shard End) Education Action Zone Order 1998 (S.I. 1998 No. 3062)
- The Kingston upon Hull (Bransholme Area) Education Action Zone Order 1998 (S.I. 1998 No. 3063)
- The Halifax Education Action Zone Order 1998 (S.I. 1998 No. 3064)
- The East Basildon Education Action Zone Order 1998 (S.I. 1998 No. 3065)
- The Birmingham (Aston and Nechells) Education Action Zone Order 1998 (S.I. 1998 No. 3066)
- The Curfew Order (Responsible Officer) (Amendment) Order 1998 (S.I. 1998 No. 3067)
- The Leicestershire Mental Health Service and the Fosse Health, Leicestershire Community National Health Service Trusts (Dissolution) Order 1998 (S.I. 1998 No. 3068)
- The Leicestershire and Rutland Healthcare National Health Service Trust (Establishment) Order 1998 (S.I. 1998 No. 3069)
- The BSE Offspring Slaughter Regulations 1998 (S.I. 1998 No. 3070)
- The Bovine Spongiform Encephalopathy (No. 2) (Amendment) Order 1998 (S.I. 1998 No. 3071)
- The Midlothian (Electoral Arrangements) Order 1998 (S.I. 1998 No. 3072 (S. 177)])
- The Inverclyde (Electoral Arrangements) Order 1998 (S.I. 1998 No. 3074 (S. 179)])
- The West Dunbartonshire (Electoral Arrangements) Order 1998 (S.I. 1998 No. 3075 (S. 180)])
- The West Lothian (Electoral Arrangements) Order 1998 (S.I. 1998 No. 3076 (S. 181)])
- The Glasgow City (Electoral Arrangements) Order 1998 (S.I. 1998 No. 3078 (S. 178)])
- The Meat and Livestock Commission Levy (Variation) Scheme (Confirmation) Order 1998 (S.I. 1998 No. 3080)
- The Controlled Foreign Companies (Excluded Countries) Regulations 1998 (S.I. 1998 No. 3081)
- The Walsgrave Hospitals National Health Service Trust (Establishment) Amendment Order 1998 (S.I. 1998 No. 3082)
- The Foreign Satellite Service Proscription (No. 2) Order 1998 (S.I. 1998 No. 3083)
- The Water (Prevention of Pollution) (Code of Practice) Order 1998 (S.I. 1998 No. 3084)
- The Medicines (Pharmacies) (Applications for Registration and Fees) Amendment Regulations 1998 (S.I. 1998 No. 3085)
- The Reserve Forces Act 1996 (Consequential Provisions etc.) Regulations 1998 (S.I. 1998 No. 3086)
- The Open-Ended Investment Companies (Investment Companies with Variable Capital) (Fees) Regulations 1998 (S.I. 1998 No. 3087)
- The Companies (Fees) (Amendment) Regulations 1998 (S.I. 1998 No. 3088)
- The Non-Domestic Rating (Collection and Enforcement) (Local Lists) (Amendment) Regulations 1998 (S.I. 1998 No. 3089)
- The M4 Motorway (London Borough of Hounslow) (Bus Lane) Order 1998 (S.I. 1998 No. 3090)
- The Finance Act 1998 (Commencement No. 1) Order 1998 (S.I. 1998 No. 3092 (C.76)])
- The Motor Vehicles (Type Approval of Reduced Pollution Adaptations) Regulations 1998 (S.I. 1998 No. 3093)
- The Vehicle Excise Duty (Reduced Pollution) Regulations 1998 (S.I. 1998 No. 3094)
- The Local Authorities (Goods and Services) (Public Bodies) (No. 6) Order 1998 (S.I. 1998 No. 3095)
- The Smoke Control Areas (Authorised Fuels) (Amendment No. 2) Regulations 1998 (S.I. 1998 No. 3096)
- The Education (Government of New Schools on Transition to New Framework) Regulations 1998 (S.I. 1998 No. 3097)
- The Southampton Community Health Services National Health Service Trust (Establishment) Amendment Order 1998 (S.I. 1998 No. 3098)
- The Register of Sasines (Registers Direct) (Scotland) Regulations 1998 (S.I. 1998 No. 3099 (S. 182)])
- The Land Registration (Scotland) Amendment Rules 1998 (S.I. 1998 No. 3100 (S. 183))

== 3101–3200 ==
- The Clackmannanshire (Electoral Arrangements) Order 1998 (S.I. 1998 No. 3101 (S. 184)])
- The East Renfrewshire (Electoral Arrangements) Order 1998 (S.I. 1998 No. 3102 (S. 185)])
- The Scottish Borders (Electoral Arrangements) Order 1998 (S.I. 1998 No. 3103 (S. 186)])
- The Aberdeen City (Electoral Arrangements) Order 1998 (S.I. 1998 No. 3104 (S. 187)])
- The Medicines for Human Use (Marketing Authorisation Etc.) Amendment Regulations 1998 (S.I. 1998 No. 3105)
- The Chemicals (Hazard Information and Packaging for Supply) (Amendment) Regulations 1998 (S.I. 1998 No. 3106)
- The Justices' Clerks (Qualifications of Assistants) (Amendment) Rules 1998 (S.I. 1998 No. 3107 (L. 18)])
- The Magistrates' Courts Committees (Northumbria) Amalgamation (Amendment) Order 1998 (S.I. 1998 No. 3108)
- The Plant Health (Forestry) (Great Britain) (Amendment) (No. 2) Order 1998 (S.I. 1998 No. 3109)
- The Excise Duty Point (External and Internal Community Transit Procedure) (Amendment) Regulations 1998 (S.I. 1998 No. 3110)
- The Road Vehicles (Authorised Weight) Regulations 1998 (S.I. 1998 No. 3111)
- The Road Vehicles (Construction and Use) (Amendment) (No. 7) Regulations 1998 (S.I. 1998 No. 3112)
- The Goods Vehicles (Plating and Testing) (Amendment) (No. 2) Regulations 1998 (S.I. 1998 No. 3113)
- The Local Government Act 1988 (Defined Activities) (Exemptions) (Hastings and Luton Borough Councils) Order 1998 (S.I. 1998 No. 3114)
- The Crime and Disorder Act 1998 (Service of Prosecution Evidence) Regulations 1998 (S.I. 1998 No. 3115)
- The Local Government Officers (Political Restrictions) Amendment Regulations 1998 (S.I. 1998 No. 3116 (S. 188)])
- The General Optical Council (Membership) Order of Council 1998 (S.I. 1998 No. 3117)
- The Sole, Plaice and Other Species (Specified Sea Areas) (Prohibition of Fishing) Order 1998 (S.I. 1998 No. 3118)
- The A1 Trunk Road (Barnet) Red Route (Clearway) Traffic Order 1996 Variation Order 1998 (S.I. 1998 No. 3127)
- The London Borough of Lambeth (Trunk Roads) Red Route (Bus Priority) Traffic Order 1998 (S.I. 1998 No. 3128)
- The Building (Local Authority Charges) Regulations 1998 (S.I. 1998 No. 3129)
- The School Standards and Framework Act 1998 (Admissions) (Modifications No. 2) Regulations 1998 (S.I. 1998 No. 3130)
- The Lancaster City Council (The River Lune Millennium Bridge) Scheme 1998 Confirmation Instrument 1998 (S.I. 1998 No. 3131)
- Civil Procedure Rules 1998 (S.I. 1998 No. 3132 (L.17)])
- The Magistrates' Courts Committees (Avon and Somerset) Amalgamation Order 1998 (S.I. 1998 No. 3133)
- The County Borough of Bridgend (Electoral Arrangements) Order 1998 (S.I. 1998 No. 3134)
- The County Borough of Caerphilly (Electoral Arrangements) Order 1998 (S.I. 1998 No. 3135)
- The County of Carmarthenshire (Electoral Arrangements) Order 1998 (S.I. 1998 No. 3136)
- The County Borough of Conwy (Electoral Arrangements) Order 1998 (S.I. 1998 No. 3137)
- The County Borough of Rhondda Cynon Taff (Electoral Arrangements) Order 1998 (S.I. 1998 No. 3138)
- The County of Denbighshire (Electoral Arrangements) Order 1998 (S.I. 1998 No. 3139)
- The County of Flintshire (Electoral Arrangements) Order 1998 (S.I. 1998 No. 3140)
- The County of Pembrokeshire (Electoral Arrangements) Order 1998 (S.I. 1998 No. 3141)
- The County Borough of Wrexham (Electoral Arrangements) Order 1998 (S.I. 1998 No. 3142)
- The County of Powys (Electoral Arrangements) Order 1998 (S.I. 1998 No. 3143)
- The West Lancashire (Parishes) Order 1998 (S.I. 1998 No. 3144)
- The Merchant Shipping (Falkland Islands Colours) Order 1998 (S.I. 1998 No. 3147)
- The Wireless Telegraphy (Colonial Ships and Aircraft) (Revocation) Order 1998 (S.I. 1998 No. 3148)
- The Health Service Commissioner for England (London Post-Graduate Teaching Hospitals Designation Orders) Revocation Order 1998 (S.I. 1998 No. 3149)
- The Local Elections (Northern Ireland) (Amendment) Order 1998 (S.I. 1998 No. 3150)
- The Double Taxation Relief (Taxes on Income) (Ireland) Order 1998 (S.I. 1998 No. 3151)
- The Parliamentary Constituencies (England) (Miscellaneous Changes) Order 1998 (S.I. 1998 No. 3152)
- The Mackerel (Specified Sea Areas) (Prohibition of Fishing) Order 1998 (S.I. 1998 No. 3153)
- The Legal Aid in Criminal and Care Proceedings (Costs) (Amendment) (No. 4) Regulations 1998 (S.I. 1998 No. 3154)
- The British Nationality (Cameroon and Mozambique) Order 1998 (S.I. 1998 No. 3161)
- Fair Employment and Treatment (Northern Ireland) Order 1998 (S.I. 1998 No. 3162 (N.I. 21)])
- The Iraq and Kuwait (United Nations Sanctions) (Amendment) Order 1998 (S.I. 1998 No. 3163)
- The Rates (Amendment) (Northern Ireland) Order 1998 (S.I. 1998 No. 3164 (N.I. 22)])
- The Education (Determining School Admission Arrangements for the Initial Year) Regulations 1998 (S.I. 1998 No. 3165)
- The Competition Act 1998 (Commencement No. 2) Order 1998 (S.I. 1998 No. 3166 (C.77)])
- The Potatoes Originating in Egypt (Amendment) Regulations 1998 (S.I. 1998 No. 3167)
- The Potatoes Originating in The Netherlands (Amendment) Regulations 1998 (S.I. 1998 No. 3168)
- The Arable Area Payments (Amendment) Regulations 1998 (S.I. 1998 No. 3169)
- The Telecommunications (Data Protection and Privacy) (Direct Marketing) Regulations 1998 (S.I. 1998 No. 3170)
- The Registration of Births, Deaths and Marriages (Fees) Order 1998 (S.I. 1998 No. 3171)
- The School Standards and Framework Act 1998 (Proposals under section 211 of the Education Act 1996) (Transitional Provisions) Regulations 1998 (S.I. 1998 No. 3172)
- The Finance Act 1994, Section 199, (Appointed Day) Order 1998 (S.I. 1998 No. 3173 (C.78)])
- The Individual Savings Account (Amendment) Regulations 1998 (S.I. 1998 No. 3174)
- The Corporation Tax (Instalment Payments)Regulations 1998 (S.I. 1998 No. 3175)
- The Taxes (Interest Rate) (Amendment No. 2) Regulations 1998 (S.I. 1998 No. 3176)
- The European Single Currency (Taxes) Regulations 1998 (S.I. 1998 No. 3177)
- The Scotland Act 1998 (Commencement) Order 1998 (S.I. 1998 No. 3178 (C. 79) (S. 193)])
- The North Ayrshire (Electoral Arrangements) Order 1998 (S.I. 1998 No. 3179 (S. 189)])
- The Dumfries and Galloway (Electoral Arrangements) Order 1998 (S.I. 1998 No. 3180 (S. 190)])
- The Dundee City (Electoral Arrangements) Order 1998 (S.I. 1998 No. 3181 (S. 191)])
- The City of Edinburgh (Electoral Arrangements) Order 1998 (S.I. 1998 No. 3182 (S. 192)])
- The Combined Probation Areas (Dyfed) Order 1998 (S.I. 1998 No. 3185)
- The Building Societies (Business Names) Regulations 1998 (S.I. 1998 No. 3186)
- The Combined Probation Areas (Kent) Order 1998 (S.I. 1998 No. 3187)
- The Combined Probation Areas (North Yorkshire) (No. 2) Order 1998 (S.I. 1998 No. 3188)
- The Combined Probation Areas (Leicestershire) Order 1998 (S.I. 1998 No. 3189)
- The Births, Deaths, Marriages and Divorces (Fees) (Scotland) Amendment Regulations 1998 (S.I. 1998 No. 3191 (S.194)])
- The Homerton Hospital National Health Service Trust (Establishment) Amendment Order 1998 (S.I. 1998 No. 3192)
- The Television Broadcasting Regulations 1998 (S.I. 1998 No. 3196)
- The Forensic Science Service Trading Fund Order 1998 (S.I. 1998 No. 3197)
- The School Standards and Framework Act 1998 (Commencement No. 4 and Transitional Provisions) Order 1998 (S.I. 1998 No. 3198 (C. 80)])
- The Land Registration Fees Order 1998 (S.I. 1998 No. 3199)

== 3201–3300 ==
- The A41 Trunk Road (Camden) Red Route (Bus Priority) Traffic Order 1998 (S.I. 1998 No. 3206)
- The Road Traffic (Permitted Parking Area and Special Parking Area) (Borough of Luton) Order 1998 (S.I. 1998 No. 3207)
- The A13 Trunk Road (Tower Hamlets) Red Route Experimental Traffic Order 1998 (S.I. 1998 No. 3212)
- The A205 Trunk Road (Lewisham) Red Route(Cycle Lane) Traffic Order 1998 (S.I. 1998 No. 3213)
- The A41 Trunk Road (Camden) Red Route Traffic Order 1998 Variation Order 1998 (S.I. 1998 No. 3214)
- The Number of Members of South Wales Police Authority Order 1998 (S.I. 1998 No. 3215)
- The Scotland Act 1998 (Transitional and Transitory Provisions) (Subordinate Legislation under the Act) Order 1998 (S.I. 1998 No. 3216 (S.195)])
- The School Standards and Framework Act 1998(Modification) (No. 2) Regulations 1998 (S.I. 1998 No. 3217)
- The Parole Board (Transfer of Functions) Order 1998 (S.I. 1998 No. 3218)
- The Local Authorities Etc. (Allowances) (Scotland) Amendment Regulations 1998 (S.I. 1998 No. 3219 (S.197)])
- The Security for Private Road Works (Scotland) Amendment Regulations 1998 (S.I. 1998 No. 3220 (S. 196)])
- The Local Government Act 1988 (Defined Activities) (Exemptions) (No. 4) Order 1998 (S.I. 1998 No. 3232)
- The Asbestos (Licensing) (Amendment) Regulations 1998 (S.I. 1998 No. 3233)
- The Financial Assistance for Environmental Purposes (No. 4) Order 1998 (S.I. 1998 No. 3234)
- The Control of Asbestos at Work (Amendment) Regulations 1998 (S.I. 1998 No. 3235)
- The Teaching and Higher Education Act 1998 (Commencement No. 4 and Transitional Provisions) Order 1998 (S.I. 1998 No. 3237 (C. 81)])
- The Road Traffic (Special Parking Area) (London Borough of Redbridge) (Amendment) Order 1998 (S.I. 1998 No. 3238)
- The Aberdeenshire (Electoral Arrangements) Order 1998 (S.I. 1998 No. 3239 (S. 198)])
- The Police Act 1997 (Authorisation of Action in Respect of Property) (Code of Practice) Order 1998 (S.I. 1998 No. 3240)
- The Police Act 1997 (Notification of Authorisations etc.) Order 1998 (S.I. 1998 No. 3241)
- The Fife (Electoral Arrangements) Order 1998 (S.I. 1998 No. 3243 (S. 199)])
- The Argyll and Bute (Electoral Arrangements) Order 1998 (S.I. 1998 No. 3244 (S. 200)])
- The East Dunbartonshire (Electoral Arrangements) Order 1998 (S.I. 1998 No. 3245 (S. 201)])
- The East Ayrshire (Electoral Arrangements) Order 1998 (S.I. 1998 No. 3246 (S. 202)])
- The South Ayrshire (Electoral Arrangements) Order 1998 (S.I. 1998 No. 3247 (S. 203)])
- The Highland (Electoral Arrangements) Order 1998 (S.I. 1998 No. 3248 (S. 204)])
- The Renfrewshire (Electoral Arrangements) Order 1998 (S.I. 1998 No. 3249 (S. 205)])
- The Comhairle nan Eilean Siar (Electoral Arrangements) Order 1998 (S.I. 1998 No. 3250 (S. 206)])
- The North Lanarkshire (Electoral Arrangements) Order 1998 (S.I. 1998 No. 3251 (S. 207)])
- The South Lanarkshire (Electoral Arrangements) Order 1998 (S.I. 1998 No. 3252 (S. 208)])
- The Stirling (Electoral Arrangements) Order 1998 (S.I. 1998 No. 3253 (S. 209)])
- The Falkirk (Electoral Arrangements) Order 1998 (S.I. 1998 No. 3254 (S. 210)])
- The Moray (Electoral Arrangements) Order 1998 (S.I. 1998 No. 3255 (S.211)])
- Act of Sederunt (Fees of Messengers-at-Arms) (Amendment) 1998 (S.I. 1998 No. 3256 (S. 212)])
- The Housing Benefit (General) Amendment (No. 2) Regulations 1998 (S.I. 1998 No. 3257)
- The NCIS Service Authority (Levying) (Amendment) Order 1998 (S.I. 1998 No. 3258)
- The National Crime Squad Service Authority (Levying) (Amendment) Order 1998 (S.I. 1998 No. 3259)
- The Education (School Performance Information)(England) (Amendment) Regulations 1998 (S.I. 1998 No. 3260)
- The City and County of Swansea(Electoral Arrangements) (No. 2) Order 1998 (S.I. 1998 No. 3261)
- The Prevention of Accidents to Children in Agriculture Regulations 1998 (S.I. 1998 No. 3262)
- The Crime and Disorder Act 1998 (Commencement No. 3 and Appointed Day) Order 1998 (S.I. 1998 No. 3263 (C. 82)])
- The Combined Probation Areas (North Wales) Order 1998 (S.I. 1998 No. 3264)
- The Combined Probation Areas (Powys) Order 1998 (S.I. 1998 No. 3265)
- The Inner London Probation Area (Amendment)Order 1998 (S.I. 1998 No. 3266)
- The Combined Probation Areas (Suffolk) Order 1998 (S.I. 1998 No. 3267)
- The Tyne and Wear Passenger Transport (Sunderland) Order 1998 (S.I. 1998 No. 3269)
- The Local Government Finance (New Parishes) (Amendment) Regulations 1998 (S.I. 1998 No. 3270)
- The City and County of Cardiff (Electoral Arrangements) Order 1998 (S.I. 1998 No. 3271)
- The Environment Act 1995 (Commencement No.13) (Scotland) Order 1998 (S.I. 1998 No. 3272 (C. 83) (S. 213)])
- The Port of Tyne Harbour Revision Order 1998 (S.I. 1998 No. 3277)

== 3301–3400 ==
- The Local Government Act 1988 (Defined Activities) (Exemption) (Enfield London Borough Council) Order 1999 (S.I. 1998 No. 3302)
- The North West Wales National Health Service Trust (Establishment) Order 1998 (S.I. 1998 No. 3314)
- The Swansea (1999) National Health Service Trust (Establishment) Order 1998 (S.I. 1998 No. 3315)
- The Carmarthenshire National Health Service Trust (Establishment) Order 1998 (S.I. 1998 No. 3316)
- The Conwy and Denbighshire National Health Service Trust (Establishment) Order 1998 (S.I. 1998 No. 3317)
- The Pontypridd and Rhondda National Health Service Trust (Establishment) Order 1998 (S.I. 1998 No. 3318)
- The Bro Morgannwg National Health Service Trust (Establishment) Order 1998 (S.I. 1998 No. 3319)
- The North East Wales National Health Service Trust (Establishment) Order 1998 (S.I. 1998 No. 3320)
- The Gwent Healthcare National Health Service Trust (Establishment) Order 1998 (S.I. 1998 No. 3321)

== See also ==
- List of statutory instruments of the United Kingdom
