= List of statutory instruments of the United Kingdom, 2002 =

This is an incomplete list of statutory instruments of the United Kingdom made in 2002.

== 1–100 ==
- The Landfill Tax (Amendment) Regulations (SI 2002/1)
- The Import and Export Restrictions (Foot-And-Mouth Disease) Regulations (SI 2002/2)
- The Import and Export Restrictions (Foot-and-Mouth Disease) (Wales) Regulations (SI 2002/8)
- The Immigration and Asylum Act 1999 (Part V Exemption: Relevant Employers) Order (SI 2002/9)
- Employment Rights (Increase of Limits) Order (SI 2002/10)
- The Tax Credits (Miscellaneous Amendments) Regulations (SI 2002/14)
- The Retained Organs Commission (Amendment) Regulations (SI 2002/34)
- The National Health Service (Optical Charges and Payments) Amendment (England) Regulations (SI 2002/35)
- The Social Security Pensions (Low Earnings Threshold) Order (SI 2002/36)
- The Road Traffic (Permitted Parking Area and Special Parking Area) (County of Norfolk) (City of Norwich) Order (SI 2002/37)
- The Primary Care Trusts (Membership, Procedure and Administration Arrangements) Amendment (No. 3) (England) Regulations (SI 2002/38)
- The EC Competition Law (Articles 84 and 85) Enforcement (Amendment) Regulations (SI 2002/42)
- The Education (National Curriculum) (Assessment Arrangements for English, Welsh, Mathematics and Science) (Key Stage 1) (Wales) Order (SI 2002/45)
- The Education (Individual Pupils' Achievements) (Information) (Wales) (Amendment) Regulations (SI 2002/46)
- The Poultry Meat, Farmed Game Bird Meat and Rabbit Meat (Hygiene and Inspection) (Amendment) (Wales) Regulations (SI 2002/47)
- The District of West Oxfordshire (Electoral Changes) Order (SI 2002/48)
- The District of South Oxfordshire (Electoral Changes) Order (SI 2002/49)
- The Dual-Use Items (Export Control) (Amendment) Regulations (SI 2002/50)
- The Fostering Services Regulations (SI 2002/57)
- The Genetically Modified Organisms (Contained Use) (Amendment) Regulations (SI 2002/63)
- The Oldham Primary Care Trust (Establishment) Order (SI 2002/64)
- The Warrington Primary Care Trust (Establishment) Order (SI 2002/65)
- The Halton Primary Care Trust (Establishment) Order (SI 2002/66)
- The Knowsley Primary Care Trust (Establishment) Order (SI 2002/67)
- The Rochdale Primary Care Trust (Establishment) Order (SI 2002/68)
- The Bury Primary Care Trust (Establishment) Order (SI 2002/69)
- The St Helens Primary Care Trust (Establishment) Order (SI 2002/70)
- The South Cambridgeshire Primary Care Trust (Establishment) Order (SI 2002/71)
- The Special Educational Needs and Disability Act 2001 (Commencement) (Wales) Order (SI 2002/74)
- The A58 Trunk Road (Halifax to M62 Motorway, Chain Bar) (Detrunking) Order (SI 2002/75)
- The Import and Export Restrictions (Foot-And-Mouth Disease) (No. 2) Regulations (SI 2002/76)
- The Closure of Prisons (H.M. Prison Haslar) Order (SI 2002/77)
- The Closure of Prisons (H.M. Young Offender Institution Dover) Order (SI 2002/78)
- The Social Fund Maternity and Funeral Expenses (General) Amendment Regulations (SI 2002/79)
- The Peak District National Park Authority (Restriction of Agricultural Operations) Order (SI 2002/80)
- The Nurses, Midwives and Health Visitors (Professional Conduct) (Amendment) Rules 2002 Approval Order (SI 2002/82)
- The Import and Export Restrictions (Foot-and-Mouth Disease) (Wales) (Amendment) Regulations (SI 2002/85)
- The Waltham Forest Housing Action Trust (Dissolution) Order (SI 2002/86)
- The Electricity (Connection Charges) Regulations (SI 2002/93)
- The Cattle Database (Amendment) (England) Regulations (SI 2002/94)
- The Cattle (Identification of Older Animals) (Amendment) Regulations (SI 2002/95)

== 101–200 ==
- The Income Support (General) (Standard Interest Rate Amendment) Regulations (SI 2002/105)
- The Education (School Day and School Year) (Amendment) (Wales) Regulations (SI 2002/107)
- The Merger Report (Interbrew SA and Bass PLC) (Interim Provision) (Revocation) Order (SI 2002/108)
- The Local Authorities (Capital Finance) (Rate of Discount for 2002/03) (England) Regulations (SI 2002/110)
- The Al-Qa'ida and Taliban (United Nations Measures) Order (SI 2002/111)
- The Al-Qa'ida and Taliban (United Nations Measures) (Overseas Territories) Order (SI 2002/112)
- The Home Energy Efficiency Scheme (England) (Amendment) Regulations (SI 2002/115)
- The Planning and Compensation Act 1991 (Amendment of Schedule 18) (England) Order (SI 2002/116)
- The Social Security Fraud Act 2001 (Commencement No. 3) Order (SI 2002/117)
- The Foot-and-Mouth Disease (Marking of Meat, Meat Preparations and Meat Products) Regulations (SI 2002/118)
- The Import and Export Restrictions (Foot-And-Mouth Disease) (No. 3) Regulations (SI 2002/119)
- The Potatoes Originating in Egypt (Amendment) (Wales) Regulations (SI 2002/120)
- The Education (Budget Statements) (Wales) Regulations (SI 2002/122)
- The Postal Services Act 2000 (Determination of Turnover for Penalties) (Amendment) Order (SI 2002/125)
- The Road Traffic (Permitted Parking Area And Special Parking Area) (City Of Southampton) Order (SI 2002/126)
- The Firearms (Amendment) Act 1988 (Firearms Consultative Committee) Order (SI 2002/127)
- The Milk Marketing Board (Dissolution) Order (SI 2002/128)
- The Foot-and-Mouth Disease (Marking of Meat, Meat Preparations and Meat Products) (Wales) Regulations (SI 2002/129)
- The Import and Export Restrictions (Foot-and-Mouth Disease) (Wales) (No. 2) Regulations (SI 2002/130)
- The Financing of Maintained Schools (Amendment) (Wales) Regulations (SI 2002/136)
- The Scarborough, Whitby and Ryedale Primary Care Trust (Establishment) Order (SI 2002/137)
- The Middlesbrough Primary Care Trust (Establishment) Order (SI 2002/138)
- The Sunderland Teaching Primary Care Trust (Establishment) Order (SI 2002/139)
- The Langbaurgh Primary Care Trust (Establishment) Order (SI 2002/140)
- The Sedgefield Primary Care Trust (Establishment) Order (SI 2002/141)
- The Easington Primary Care Trust (Establishment) Order (SI 2002/142)
- The North Kirklees Primary Care Trust (Establishment) Order (SI 2002/143)
- The Calderdale Primary Care Trust (Establishment) Order (SI 2002/144)
- The Derwentside Primary Care Trust (Establishment) Order (SI 2002/145)
- The Gateshead Primary Care Trust (Establishment) Order (SI 2002/146)
- The Durham Dales Primary Care Trust (Establishment) Order (SI 2002/147)
- The Durham and Chester-le-Street Primary Care Trust (Establishment) Order (SI 2002/148)
- The Craven, Harrogate and Rural District Primary Care Trust (Establishment) Order (SI 2002/149)
- The Darlington Primary Care Trust (Establishment) Order (SI 2002/150)
- The Financial Assistance For Industry (Increase of Limit) Order (SI 2002/151)
- The Education (Special Educational Needs) (Wales) Regulations (SI 2002/152)
- The Welfare Reform and Pensions Act 1999 (Commencement No. 13) Order (SI 2002/153)
- The Local Authorities (Alteration of Requisite Calculations) (England) Regulations (SI 2002/155)
- The Special Educational Needs Code of Practice (Appointed Day) (Wales) Order (SI 2002/156)
- The Special Educational Needs (Provision of Information by Local Education Authorities) (Wales) Regulations (SI 2002/157)
- The South Tyneside Primary Care Trust (Establishment) Order (SI 2002/166)
- The Education (Mandatory Awards) Regulations 2001 (Amendment) (No. 3) Regulations (SI 2002/173)
- The Education (Student Support) Regulations 2001 (Amendment) (No. 3) Regulations (SI 2002/174)
- The Council Tax and Non-Domestic Rating (Demand Notices) (England) (Amendment) Regulations (SI 2002/180)
- The Public Service Vehicles (Registration of Local Services) (Amendment) (England and Wales) Regulations 2 (SI 2002/182)
- The Food and Animal Feedingstuffs (Products of Animal Origin from China) (Control) (England) Regulations (SI 2002/183)
- The Local Authorities (Mayoral Elections) (England and Wales) Regulations (SI 2002/185)
- The National Health Service (Optical Charges and Payments) (Amendment) (Wales) Regulations (SI 2002/186)
- The County of Herefordshire District Council (Electoral Changes) Order (SI 2002/187)
- The Immigration (Designation of Travel Bans) (Amendment) Order (SI 2002/192)
- The Justices of the Peace (Size and Chairmanship of Bench) Rules (SI 2002/193)
- The Magistrates' Courts (Civil Jurisdiction and Judgments Act 1982) (Amendment) Rules (SI 2002/194)
- The Education (Student Support) Regulations (SI 2002/195)
- The Postal Services Act 2000 (Modification of Section 7) Order (SI 2002/200)

== 201–300 ==
- The Royal Marines Terms of Service (Amendment) Regulations (SI 2002/201)
- The Animal Gatherings (Interim Measures) (England) Order (SI 2002/202)
- The Food and Animal Feedingstuffs (Products of Animal Origin from China) (Control) (Wales) Regulations (SI 2002/203)
- The Income Tax (Exemption of Minor Benefits) Regulations (SI 2002/205)
- The Local Government Pension Scheme (Amendment) Regulations (SI 2002/206)
- The A40 London to Fishguard Trunk Road (M40 Junction 8 to A44 Wolvercote Roundabout) (Detrunking) Order (SI 2002/207)
- The Social Security (Attendance Allowance and Disability Living Allowance) (Amendment) Regulations (SI 2002/208)
- The A41 London to Birkenhead Trunk Road (Buckinghamshire) (Detrunking) Order (SI 2002/215)
- The A423 Maidenhead to Oxford Trunk Road (A34 Hinksey Hill Interchange to A4142 Heyford Hill Roundabout) (Detrunking) Order (SI 2002/216)
- The A44 London to Aberystwyth Trunk Road (A34 Peartree Roundabout to A40 Wolvercote Roundabout) (Detrunking) Order (SI 2002/217)
- Fur Farming (Compensation Scheme) (England) Order (SI 2002/221)
- The Supreme Court Fees (Amendment) Order (SI 2002/222)
- The County Court Fees (Amendment) Order (SI 2002/223)
- The Elections (Policy Development Grants Scheme) Order (SI 2002/224)
- The Statutory Maternity Pay (Compensation of Employers) Amendment Regulations (SI 2002/225)
- The Forestry (Felling of Trees) (England and Wales) (Amendment) Regulations (SI 2002/226)
- The Road Vehicles (Construction and Use) (Amendment) Regulations (SI 2002/227)
- The Anti-terrorism, Crime and Security Act 2001 (Commencement No. 3) Order (SI 2002/228)
- The Courts-Martial (Royal Air Force) (Amendment) Rules (SI 2002/229)
- The Courts-Martial (Army) (Amendment) Rules (SI 2002/230)
- The Courts-Martial (Royal Navy) (Amendment) Rules (SI 2002/231)
- The Education (Mandatory Awards) Regulations 2001 (Amendment) (No. 4) Regulations (SI 2002/232)
- The Police Act 1997 (Criminal Records) Regulations (SI 2002/233)
- The Medicines (Codification Amendments Etc.) Regulations (SI 2002/236)
- The Road Traffic (NHS Charges) Amendment Regulations (SI 2002/237)
- The Social Security (Contributions) (Amendment) Regulations (SI 2002/238)
- The Sheep and Goats Identification and Movement (Interim Measures) (England) Order (SI 2002/240)
- The Pigs (Records, Identification and Movement) (Interim Measures) (England) Order (SI 2002/241)
- The Disease Control (Interim Measures) (England) Order (SI 2002/242)
- The Broomfield Agricultural College (Dissolution) Order (SI 2002/243)
- The Mackworth College (Dissolution) Order (SI 2002/244)
- The Derby Tertiary College-Wilmorton (Dissolution) Order (SI 2002/245)
- The East Yorkshire College of Further Education, Bridlington (Dissolution) Order (SI 2002/246)
- The Patents and Plant Variety Rights (Compulsory Licensing) Regulations (SI 2002/247)
- The European Communities (Designation) Order (SI 2002/248)
- The Pitcairn Court of Appeal Order 2000 (Amendment) Order (SI 2002/249)
- The Territorial Sea Act 1987 (Jersey) (Amendment) Order (SI 2002/250)
- The Al-Qa'ida and Taliban (United Nations Measures) (Amendment) Order (SI 2002/251)
- The Education (Chief Inspector of Schools in England) Order (SI 2002/252)
- The Nursing and Midwifery Order (SI 2002/253)
- The Health Professions Order (SI 2002/254)
- The Criminal Justice (International Co-operation) Act 1990 (Enforcement of Overseas Forfeiture Orders) (Amendment) Order (SI 2002/255)
- The Criminal Justice Act 1988 (Designated Countries and Territories) (Amendment) Order (SI 2002/256)
- The Drug Trafficking Act 1994 (Designated Countries and Territories) (Amendment) Order (SI 2002/257)
- The Al-Qa'ida and Taliban (United Nations Measures) (Channel Islands) Order (SI 2002/258)
- The Al-Qa'ida and Taliban (United Nations Measures) (Isle of Man) Order (SI 2002/259)
- The Education (Chief Inspector of Education and Training in Wales) Order (SI 2002/260)
- The Scotland Act 1998 (Agency Arrangements) (Specification) Order (SI 2002/261)
- The Summer Time Order (SI 2002/262)
- The Carriage by Air Acts (Implementation of the Montreal Convention 1999) Order (SI 2002/263)
- The Air Navigation (Amendment) Order (SI 2002/264)
- The Northern Ireland Act 1998 (Modification) Order (SI 2002/265)
- The Al-Qa'ida and Taliban (United Nations Measures) (Overseas Territories) (Amendment) Order (SI 2002/266)
- The Greater London Authority (Allocation of Grants for Precept Calculations) Regulations (SI 2002/267)
- The Marketing Authorisations for Veterinary Medicinal Products (Amendment) Regulations (SI 2002/269)
- The Hill Farm Allowance Regulations (SI 2002/271)
- The Sea Fishing (Enforcement of Community Quota and Third Country Fishing Measures) Order (SI 2002/272)
- The Cattle (Identification of Older Animals) (Wales) (Amendment) Regulations (SI 2002/273)
- The Sheep and Goats Identification and Movement (Interim Measures) (Wales) Regulations (SI 2002/274)
- The Pollution Prevention and Control (England and Wales) (Amendment) Regulations (SI 2002/275)
- The Road Traffic (Permitted Parking Area and Special Parking Area) (County of Cumbria) (District of South Lakeland) Order (SI 2002/276)
- The Learning and Skills Act 2000 (Commencement No. 4) and Transitional Provisions Order (SI 2002/279)
- The Disease Control (Interim Measures) (Wales) Order (SI 2002/280)
- The Pigs (Records, Identification and Movement) (Interim Measures) (Wales) Order (SI 2002/281)
- The Health and Safety at Work etc. Act 1974 (Application to Environmentally Hazardous Substances) Regulations (SI 2002/282)
- The Animal Gatherings (Interim Measures) (Wales) Order (SI 2002/283)
- The Diseases of Fish (Control) (Amendment) (England and Wales) Regulations (SI 2002/284)
- The Rail Vehicle Accessibility (East Hayling Light Railway Vehicles) Exemption Order (SI 2002/285)
- The Plant Health (Forestry) (Great Britain) (Amendment) Order (SI 2002/295)
- The Treatment of Spruce Bark (Amendment) Order (SI 2002/296)

== 301–400 ==
- The Industrial Training Levy (Engineering Construction Board) Order (SI 2002/302)
- The Industrial Training Levy (Construction Board) Order (SI 2002/303)
- The Cattle Database (Amendment) (Wales) Regulations (SI 2002/304)
- The Local Government (Best Value) Performance Plans and Reviews Amendment and Specified Dates Order (SI 2002/305)
- The Whitehaven Harbour Commissioners (Constitution) Harbour Revision Order (SI 2002/306)
- The Social Security (Contributions) (Amendment No. 2) Regulations (SI 2002/307)
- The Pennine Acute Hospitals National Health Service Trust (Establishment) and the Bury Health Care National Health Service Trust, the Rochdale Healthcare National Health Service Trust, the Oldham National Health Service Trust and the North Manchester Healthcare National Health Service Trust (Dissolution) Order (SI 2002/308)
- The A41 Trunk Road (Staffordshire and Telford & Wrekin) (Detrunking) Order (SI 2002/309)
- The Yarmouth (Isle of Wight) Harbour Revision Order (SI 2002/311)
- The Chiropractors Act 1994 (Commencement No. 6) Order (SI 2002/312)
- The Travel Restriction Order (Prescribed Removal Powers) Order (SI 2002/313)
- The Export of Goods (Federal Republic of Yugoslavia) (Control) (Revocation) Order (SI 2002/315)
- The Federal Republic of Yugoslavia (Supply and Sale of Equipment) (Penalties and Licences) (Revocation) Regulations (SI 2002/316)
- The Companies (Fees) (Amendment) Regulations (SI 2002/317)
- The Electronic Signatures Regulations (SI 2002/318)
- The Care Homes (Wales) Regulations (SI 2002/324)
- Private and Voluntary Health Care (Wales) Regulations (SI 2002/325)
- The General Teaching Council for Wales (Fees) Regulations (SI 2002/326)
- The Children's Homes (Wales) Regulations (SI 2002/327)
- The Local Authorities (Alteration of Requisite Calculations) (Wales) Regulations (SI 2002/328)
- The Miscellaneous Food Additives (Amendment) (Wales) Regulations (SI 2002/329)
- The Sweeteners in Food (Amendment) (Wales) Regulations (SI 2002/330)
- The Non-Domestic Rating (Rural Rate Relief) (Wales) Order (SI 2002/331)
- The Notification of Marketing of Food for Particular Nutritional Uses (England and Wales) Regulations (SI 2002/333)
- The Food (Star Anise from Third Countries) (Emergency Control) (England) Order (SI 2002/334)
- The Public Service Vehicles (Conditions of Fitness, Equipment, Use and Certification) (Amendment) Regulations (SI 2002/335)
- The Assured Tenancies and Agricultural Occupancies (Forms) (Amendment) (England) Regulations (SI 2002/337)
- The Income Support (General) (Standard Interest Rate Amendment) (No.2) Regulations (SI 2002/338)
- The Relevant Authorities (Standards Committee) (Dispensations) Regulations (SI 2002/339)
- The A49 Trunk Road in Shropshire (A49/A5 Preston Roundabout to A49/A41 Prees Heath Roundabout and A49/A41 Chester Road Roundabout to the County of Cheshire Border) (Detrunking) Order (SI 2002/340)
- The A41 Trunk Road Shropshire (Telford & Wrekin Border to the County of Cheshire Border) (Detrunking) Order (SI 2002/341)
- The A41 Trunk Road in Shropshire (A41/M54 Roundabout to the Telford & Wrekin Border) (Detrunking) Order (SI 2002/342)
- The M25 Motorway (Heathrow Terminal 5 Access) (No1) Connecting Roads Scheme (SI 2002/343)
- The Criminal Justice and Police Act 2001 (Commencement No. 4 and Transitional Provisions) Order (SI 2002/344)
- The Armed Forces Act 2001 (Commencement No. 2) Order (SI 2002/345)
- The National Ports Council Pension Scheme (Excess Statutory Surplus) Order (SI 2002/346)
- The Social Security (Claims and Payments) Amendment Regulations (SI 2002/355)
- The South Huddersfield Primary Care Trust (Establishment) Order (SI 2002/356)
- The Hambleton and Richmondshire Primary Care Trust (Establishment) Order (SI 2002/357)
- The Huddersfield Central Primary Care Trust (Establishment) Order (SI 2002/358)
- The Terrorism Act 2000 (Continuance of Part VII) Order (SI 2002/365)
- Bitton Railway Order 2002 (SI 2002/366)
- The Deregulation (Disposals of Dwelling-houses by Local Authorities) Order (SI 2002/367)
- The Limited Partnerships (Unrestricted Size) No. 4 Regulations (SI 2002/376)
- The Financing of Maintained Schools (England) Regulations (SI 2002/377)
- The School Budget Shares (Prescribed Purposes) (England) Regulations (SI 2002/378)
- The Sweeteners in Food (Amendment) (England) Regulations (SI 2002/379)
- The Occupational Pension Schemes (Minimum Funding Requirement and Miscellaneous Amendments) Regulations (SI 2002/380)
- The Welfare Reform and Pensions Act 1999 (Commencement No. 14) Order (SI 2002/381)
- The Social Security Amendment (Residential Care and Nursing Homes) Regulations (SI 2002/398)
- The Public Telecommunication System Designation (Telekom Malaysia (UK) Limited) Order (SI 2002/399)
- The Public Telecommunication System Designation (France Telecom Network Services—UK Ltd) Order (SI 2002/400)

== 401–500 ==
- The Food (Star Anise from Third Countries) (Emergency Control) (Wales) Order (SI 2002/402)
- The Social Security Fraud Act 2001 (Commencement No. 4) Order (SI 2002/403)
- The Education (Amount to Follow Permanently Excluded Pupil) (Amendment) (Wales) Regulations (SI 2002/408)
- The National Assistance (Assessment of Resources) (Amendment) (England) Regulations (SI 2002/410)
- The National Assistance (Sums for Personal Requirements) (England) Regulations (SI 2002/411)
- The Chester Guided Busway Order (SI 2002/412)
- The Police Act 1997 (Commencement No. 9) Order (SI 2002/413)
- The Registered Parties (Non-constituent and Non-affiliated Organisations) (Amendment) Order (SI 2002/414)
- The European Union Extradition Regulations (SI 2002/419)
- The Road Traffic (Permitted Parking Area and Special Parking Area) (Borough of Milton Keynes) Order (SI 2002/421)
- The Road Traffic (Permitted Parking Area and Special Parking Area) (Borough of Poole) Order (SI 2002/422)
- The Education Development Plans (England) (Amendment) Regulations (SI 2002/423)
- The Litter (Fixed Penalty) (England) Order (SI 2002/424)
- The Dog Fouling (Fixed Penalty) (England) Order (SI 2002/425)
- The Sea Fishing (Enforcement of Community Conservation Measures) (Amendment) Order (SI 2002/426)
- The Occupational and Personal Pension Schemes (Bankruptcy) Regulations (SI 2002/427)
- The Social Security (Claims and Payments and Miscellaneous Amendments) Regulations (SI 2002/428)
- The Animals and Animal Products (Import and Export) (England and Wales) (Amendment) (Wales) Regulations (SI 2002/430)
- The Import and Export Restrictions (Foot-and-Mouth Disease) (Wales) (No.2) (Revocation) Regulations (SI 2002/431)
- The School Organisation Proposals by the National Council for Education and Training for Wales Regulations (SI 2002/432)
- The A64 Trunk Road (Musham Bank Roundabout to Queen Margaret's Roundabout) (Detrunking) Order (SI 2002/434)
- The Education (QCA Levy) Regulations (SI 2002/435)
- The Child Support, Pensions and Social Security Act 2000 (Commencement No. 11) Order (SI 2002/437)
- The Education Standards Grants (Wales) Regulations (SI 2002/438)
- The Civil Procedure (Modification of Enactments) Order (SI 2002/439)
- The Building (Amendment) Regulations (SI 2002/440)
- The Rehabilitation of Offenders Act 1974 (Exceptions) (Amendment) Order (SI 2002/441)
- The Velindre National Health Service Trust (Establishment) Amendment Order (SI 2002/442)
- The Overseas Insurers (Tax Representatives) (Amendment) Regulations (SI 2002/443)
- The Life Assurance and Other Policies (Keeping of Information and Duties of Insurers) (Amendment) Regulations (SI 2002/444)
- The Contracting Out (Functions in relation to Apsley House) Order (SI 2002/445)
- The Police Act 1997 (Enhanced Criminal Record Certificates) (Protection of Vulnerable Adults) Regulations (SI 2002/446)
- The Criminal Justice and Public Order Act 1994 (Commencement No. 13) Order (SI 2002/447)
- The Local Authorities (Capital Finance and Approved Investments) (Amendment) (England) Regulations (SI 2002/451)
- Town and Country Planning (Costs of Inquiries etc.) (Standard Daily Amount) (England) Regulations (SI 2002/452)
- The Individual Savings Account (Amendment) Regulations (SI 2002/453)
- The Whole of Government Accounts (Designation of Bodies) Order (SI 2002/454)
- The Personal Portfolio Bonds (Tax) (Amendment) Regulations (SI 2002/455)
- The Value Added Tax (Equipment in Lifeboats) Order (SI 2002/456)
- The Dairy Produce Quotas Regulations (SI 2002/457)
- The Dairy Produce Quotas (General Provisions) Regulations (SI 2002/458)
- The Occupational Pension Schemes (Winding Up Notices and Reports etc.) Regulations (SI 2002/459)
- The Deregulation (Bingo and Other Gaming) Order (SI 2002/460)
- The Control of Noise (Codes of Practice for Construction and Open Sites) (England) Order (SI 2002/461)
- The Animals and Animal Products (Import and Export) (England and Wales) (Amendment) (England) Regulations (SI 2002/467)
- The Import and Export Restrictions (Foot-and-Mouth Disease) (No. 3) (Revocation) Regulations (SI 2002/468)
- The Social Fund Maternity and Funeral Expenses (General) Amendment (No. 2) Regulations (SI 2002/470)
- The Asylum Support (Interim Provisions) (Amendment) Regulations (SI 2002/471)
- The Asylum Support (Amendment) Regulations (SI 2002/472)
- The Animals (Scientific Procedures) Act 1986 (Fees) (Amendment) Order (SI 2002/473)
- The Gas (Standards of Performance) Regulations (SI 2002/475)
- The Electricity (Standards of Performance) (Amendment) Regulations (SI 2002/476)
- The Education (Funding for Teacher Training) Designation Order (SI 2002/479)
- The Social Security (Loss of Benefit) Amendment Regulations (SI 2002/486)
- The Goods Vehicles (Plating and Testing) (Amendment) Regulations (SI 2002/487)
- The Motor Vehicles (Tests) (Amendment) Regulations (SI 2002/488)
- The Public Service Vehicles (Conditions Of Fitness, Equipment, Use And Certification) (Amendment) Regulations (SI 2002/489)
- The Social Security (Loss of Benefit) (Consequential Amendments) Regulations (SI 2002/490)
- The Social Security (Incapacity) (Miscellaneous Amendments) Regulations (SI 2002/491)
- The Social Security (Guardian's Allowances) Amendment Regulations (SI 2002/492)
- The Deregulation (Restaurant Licensing Hours) Order (SI 2002/493)
- The Non-Domestic Rating (Alteration of Lists and Appeals) (Amendment) (England) Regulations (SI 2002/498)
- The Housing Benefit and Council Tax Benefit (Child Care Charges) Regulations (SI 2002/499)
- The Osteopaths Act 1993 (Commencement No. 7) Order (SI 2002/500)

== 501–600 ==
- The Excise Goods (Accompanying Documents) Regulations (SI 2002/501)
- The Companies (Competent Authority) (Fees) Regulations (SI 2002/502)
- The Limited Liability Partnerships (Competent Authority) (Fees) Regulations (SI 2002/503)
- The Merchant Shipping (Light Dues) (Amendment) Regulations (SI 2002/504)
- The Electoral Commission (Limit on Public Awareness Expenditure) Order (SI 2002/505)
- The Hallmarking (International Convention) Order (SI 2002/506)
- The Teacher Training Agency (Additional Functions) (England) Order (SI 2002/507)
- The Education (Teacher Training Bursaries) (England) Regulations (SI 2002/508)
- The Education (Bursaries for School Teacher Training) (England) Regulations (SI 2002/509)
- The Education Standards Fund (England) Regulations (SI 2002/510)
- The Measuring Instruments (EEC Requirements) (Fees) (Amendment) Regulations (SI 2002/511)
- The Social Security Revaluation of Earnings Factors Order (SI 2002/519)
- The Service Subsidy Agreements (Tendering) (Amendment) (Wales) Regulations (SI 2002/520)
- The Local Authorities (Conduct of Referendums) (England) (Amendment) Regulations (SI 2002/521)
- The Local Authorities (Goods and Services) (Public Bodies) (England) Order (SI 2002/522)
- The Local Government (Best Value) Performance Indicators and Performance Standards Order (SI 2002/523)
- The Tax Credits (Miscellaneous Amendments) (Northern Ireland) Regulations (SI 2002/524)
- The Tax Credits (Miscellaneous Amendments No. 2) Regulations (SI 2002/525)
- The Plant Protection Products (Amendment) Regulations (SI 2002/526)
- The Tax Credits (Claims and Payments and Miscellaneous Amendments) (Northern Ireland) Regulations (SI 2002/527)
- The Environmental Protection (Controls on Ozone-Depleting Substances) Regulations (SI 2002/528)
- The Patents (Amendment) Rules (SI 2002/529)
- The Housing Renewal Grants (Amendment) (England) Regulations (SI 2002/530)
- The Environmental Protection (Waste Recycling Payments) (Amendment) (England) Regulations (SI 2002/531)
- The Redundancy Payments (Continuity of Employment in Local Government, etc.) (Modification) (Amendment) Order (SI 2002/532)
- The Criminal Justice and Police Act 2001 (Commencement No. 5) Order (SI 2002/533)
- The Criminal Justice and Police Act 2001 (Central Police Training and Development Authority) (Transitional Provisions) Order (SI 2002/534)
- The Education (Budget Statements) (England)Regulations (SI 2002/535)
- The Education (Outturn Statements) (England) Regulations (SI 2002/536)
- The International Carriage of Dangerous Goods by Road (Fees) (Amendment) Regulations (SI 2002/537)
- The Passenger and Goods Vehicles (Recording Equipment) (Approval of Fitters and Workshops) (Fees) (Amendment) Regulations (SI 2002/538)
- The International Transport of Goods under Cover of TIR Carnets (Fees) (Amendment) Regulations (SI 2002/539)
- The Medicines for Human Use and Medical Devices (Fees and Miscellaneous Amendments) Regulations (SI 2002/542)
- The National Health Service (England) (Pilot Schemes: Miscellaneous Provisions and Consequential Amendments) Amendment Regulations (SI 2002/543)
- The National Health Service (Dental Charges) Amendment Regulations (SI 2002/544)
- The National Health Service (Functions of Health Authorities) (England) (Support of Provision of Services and Appraisal) Regulations (SI 2002/545)
- Children Act (Miscellaneous Amendments) (England) Regulations (SI 2002/546)
- The National Health Service (Optical Charges and Payments) Amendment (No. 2) Regulations (SI 2002/547)
- The National Health Service (Charges for Drugs and Appliances) Amendment Regulations (SI 2002/548)
- The Prescription Only Medicines (Human Use) Amendment Order (SI 2002/549)
- The Welfare Food (Amendment) Regulations (SI 2002/550)
- The National Health Service (Pharmaceutical Services) and (General Medical Services) (No. 2) Amendment Regulations (SI 2002/551)
- The National Care Standards Commission (Inspection of Schools and Colleges) Regulations (SI 2002/552)
- The Health Authorities (Establishment and Abolition) (England) Order (SI 2002/553)
- The National Health Service (General Medical Services) Amendment Regulations (SI 2002/554)
- The Primary Care Trusts (Functions) (England) Amendment Regulations (SI 2002/555)
- The Health Authorities (Membership and Procedure) Amendment (England) Regulations (SI 2002/556)
- The Primary Care Trusts (Membership, Procedure and Administration Arrangements) Amendment (No. 2) (England) Regulations (SI 2002/557)
- The National Health Service (General Dental Services) Amendment Regulations (SI 2002/558)
- The Ashworth Hospital Authority (Abolition) Order (SI 2002/559)
- The North West Anglia Health Care National Health Service Trust (Transfer of Trust Property) Order (SI 2002/560)
- The National Health Service Pension Scheme (Amendment) Regulations (SI 2002/561)
- The East Berkshire Community Health National Health Service Trust (Transfer of Trust Property) Order (SI 2002/562)
- The South Staffordshire Health Authority (Transfer of Trust Property) Order (SI 2002/563)
- The Rochdale Healthcare National Health Service Trust (Transfer of Trust Property) Order (SI 2002/564)
- The South and West Devon Health Authority (Transfer of Trust Property) Order (SI 2002/565)
- The St Helens and Knowsley Community Health National Health Service Trust (Transfer of Trust Property) Order (SI 2002/566)
- The Wiltshire and Swindon Health Care National Health Service Trust (Transfer of Trust Property) Order (SI 2002/567)
- The Doncaster Health Authority (Transfer of Trust Property) Order (SI 2002/568)
- The Sandwell Health Authority (Transfer of Trust Property) Order (SI 2002/569)
- The Hillingdon Health Authority (Transfer of Trust Property) Order (SI 2002/570)
- The Croydon Health Authority (Transfer of Trust Property) Order (SI 2002/571)
- The Kensington & Chelsea and Westminster Health Authority (Transfer of Trust Property) Order (SI 2002/572)
- The Brent & Harrow Health Authority (Transfer of Trust Property) Order (SI 2002/573)
- The South Essex Health Authority (Transfer of Trust Property) Order (SI 2002/574)
- The Rotherham Health Authority (Transfer of Trust Property) Order (SI 2002/575)
- The Worcestershire Health Authority (Transfer of Trust Property) Order (SI 2002/576)
- The North Mersey Community National Health Service Trust (Transfer of Trust Property) Order (SI 2002/577)
- The North and East Devon Health Authority (Transfer of Trust Property) Order (SI 2002/578)
- The Oldham National Health Service Trust (Transfer of Trust Property) Order (SI 2002/579)
- The National Health Service (Travelling Expenses and Remission of Charges) Amendment Regulations (SI 2002/580)
- The Oxfordshire Health Authority (Transfer of Trust Property) Order (SI 2002/581)
- The Cheshire Community Healthcare National Health Service Trust (Transfer of Trust Property) Order (SI 2002/582)
- The Community Health Care Service (North Derbyshire) National Health Service Trust (Transfer of Trust Property) Order (SI 2002/583)
- The CommuniCare National Health Service Trust (Transfer of Trust Property) Order (SI 2002/584)
- The Cambridgeshire Health Authority (Transfer of Trust Property) Order (SI 2002/585)
- The North Essex Health Authority (Transfer of Trust Property) Order (SI 2002/586)
- The Southampton and South West Hampshire Health Authority (Transfer of Trust Property) Order (SI 2002/587)
- The Warwickshire Health Authority (Transfer of Trust Property) Order (SI 2002/588)
- The Shropshire Health Authority (Transfer of Trust Property) Order (SI 2002/589)
- The North Manchester Healthcare National Health Service Trust (Transfer of Trust Property) Order (SI 2002/590)
- The North Sefton and West Lancashire Community National Health Service Trust (Transfer of Trust Property) Order (SI 2002/591)
- The North Derbyshire Health Authority (Transfer of Trust Property) Order (SI 2002/592)
- The North Cumbria Health Authority (Transfer of Trust Property) Order (SI 2002/593)
- The Norfolk Health Authority (Transfer of Trust Property) Order (SI 2002/594)
- The Liverpool Health Authority (Transfer of Trust Property) Order (SI 2002/595)
- The Leicestershire Health Authority (Transfer of Trust Property) Order (SI 2002/596)
- The Hertfordshire Health Authority (Transfer of Trust Property) Order (SI 2002/597)
- The East Lancashire Health Authority (Transfer of Trust Property) Order (SI 2002/598)
- The Bury Health Care National Health Service Trust (Transfer of Trust Property) Order (SI 2002/599)
- The Birmingham Health Authority (Transfer of Trust Property) Order (SI 2002/600)

== 601–700 ==
- The National Health Service (General Ophthalmic Services) Amendment Regulations (SI 2002/601)
- The Food (Star Anise from Third Countries) (Emergency Control) (England) (Amendment) Order (SI 2002/602)
- The National Care Standards Commission (Director of Private and Voluntary Health Care) Regulations (SI 2002/603)
- The Riverside Community Health Care National Health Service Trust (Transfer of Trust Property) Order (SI 2002/604)
- The Ealing, Hammersmith & Hounslow Health Authority (Transfer of Trust Property) Order (SI 2002/605)
- The North Warwickshire National Health Service Trust (Transfer of Trust Property) Order (SI 2002/606)
- The Birmingham Specialist Community Health National Health Service Trust (Transfer of Trust Property) Order (SI 2002/607)
- The Shropshire's Community & Mental Health Services National Health Service Trust (Transfer of Trust Property) Order (SI 2002/608)
- The Essex Rivers Healthcare National Health Service Trust (Transfer of Trust Property) Order (SI 2002/609)
- The National Health Service Pension Scheme (Additional Voluntary Contributions) Amendment Regulations (SI 2002/610)
- London Service Permits (Appeals) Regulations (SI 2002/614)
- The Police and Criminal Evidence Act 1984 (Codes of Practice) (Temporary Modifications to Code D) Order (SI 2002/615)
- The South Birmingham Primary Care Trust (Establishment) Order (SI 2002/616)
- The Central Cheshire Primary Care Trust (Establishment) Order (SI 2002/617)
- The Medical Devices Regulations (SI 2002/618)
- The Gloucestershire Royal National Health Service Trust (Transfer of Trust Property) Order (SI 2002/619)
- The East Gloucestershire National Health Service Trust (Transfer of Trust Property) Order (SI 2002/620)
- The Gloucestershire Health Authority (Transfer of Trust Property) Order (SI 2002/621)
- The Croydon and Surrey Downs Community National Health Service Trust (Transfer of Trust Property) Order (SI 2002/622)
- The Harrow and Hillingdon Healthcare National Health Service Trust (Transfer of Trust Property) Order (SI 2002/623)
- The Southampton Community Health Services National Health Service Trust (Transfer of Trust Property) Order (SI 2002/624)
- The Somerset Health Authority (Transfer of Trust Property) Order (SI 2002/625)
- The South Warwickshire Combined Care National Health Service Trust (Transfer of Trust Property) Order (SI 2002/626)
- The Rotherham Priority Health Services National Health Service Trust (Transfer of Trust Property) Order (SI 2002/627)
- The Portsmouth Healthcare National Health Service Trust (Transfer of Trust Property) Order (SI 2002/628)
- The Care Standards Act 2000 (Commencement No. 11) Order (SI 2002/629)
- The Tameside & Glossop Community and Priority Services National Health Service Trust (Transfer of Trust Property) Order (SI 2002/630)
- The Barnsley Community and Priority Services National Health Service Trust (Transfer of Trust Property) Order (SI 2002/631)
- The Taunton and Somerset National Health Service Trust (Transfer of Trust Property) Order (SI 2002/632)
- The Warrington Community Healthcare National Health Service Trust (Transfer of Trust Property) Order (SI 2002/633)
- The North Warwickshire Primary Care Trust (Establishment) Order (SI 2002/634)
- Disqualification from Caring for Children (England) Regulations (SI 2002/635)
- The Redbridge and Waltham Forest Health Authority (Transfer of Trust Property) Order (SI 2002/636)
- The Gaming Act (Variation of Fees) (England and Wales) Order (SI 2002/637)
- The Awards For All (England) Joint Scheme (Authorisation) Order (SI 2002/638)
- The Lotteries (Gaming Board Fees) Order (SI 2002/639)
- The Gaming (Bingo) Act (Fees) (Amendment) Order (SI 2002/640)
- The Wireless Telegraphy (Television Licence Fees) (Amendment) Regulations (SI 2002/641)
- The Gaming Act (Variation of Fees) (England and Wales and Scotland) Order (SI 2002/642)
- The Transport Tribunal (Amendment) Rules (SI 2002/643)
- The Damages for Bereavement (Variation of Sum) (England and Wales) Order (SI 2002/644)
- The Damages for Bereavement (Variation of Sum) (Northern Ireland) Order (SI 2002/645)
- The Common Agricultural Policy Support Schemes (Appeals) Regulations (SI 2002/646)
- The Cambridgeshire and Peterborough Mental Health Partnership National Health Service Trust (Establishment) and the Lifespan Health Care Cambridge National Health Service Trust and the North West Anglia Health Care National Health Service Trust (Dissolution) Order (SI 2002/647)
- The Social Security (Disability Living Allowance) (Amendment) Regulations (SI 2002/648)
- The Guaranteed Minimum Pensions Increase Order (SI 2002/649)
- The Blaenau Gwent and Caerphilly (Tredegar and Rhymney) Order (SI 2002/651)
- The Neath Port Talbot and Swansea (Trebanos and Clydach) Order (SI 2002/652)
- The Scottish Water (Transfer of Functions, etc.) (Tax Provisions) Order (SI 2002/653)
- The Rhondda Cynon Taff and Vale of Glamorgan (Llanharry, Pont-y-clun, Penllyn, Welsh St Donats and Pendoylan) Order (SI 2002/654)
- The Health and Safety (Fees) Regulations (SI 2002/655)
- The Rail Vehicle Accessibility (South West Trains Class 458 Vehicles) Exemption Order (SI 2002/656)
- The Rail Vehicle Accessibility (Cairngorm Funicular Railway) Exemption Order (SI 2002/657)
- The Transport Act 2000 (Commencement No. 8 and Transitional Provisions) Order (SI 2002/658)
- The Relocation Grants (Form of Application) (Amendment) (England) Regulations (SI 2002/666)
- The Housing Renewal Grants (Prescribed Form and Particulars) (Amendment) (England) Regulations (SI 2002/667)
- The Social Security Benefits Up-rating Order (SI 2002/668)
- The Social Security (Work-focused Interviews for Lone Parents) Amendment Regulations (SI 2002/670)
- The Pensions (Polish Forces) Scheme (Extension) Order (SI 2002/671)
- The Personal Injuries (Civilians) Amendment Scheme (SI 2002/672)
- The Travel Concessions (Eligibility) Act 2002 (Commencement) (England) Order (SI 2002/673)
- The Waste Management Licensing (Amendment) (England) Regulations (SI 2002/674)
- The Fisheries and Aquaculture Structures (Grants) (Wales) Regulations (SI 2002/675)
- The Lobsters and Crawfish (Prohibition of Fishing and Landing) (Wales) Order (SI 2002/676)
- The Sea Fishing (Enforcement of Community Satellite Monitoring Measures) (Wales) Order 2000 Amendment Regulations (SI 2002/677)
- The Local Government Best Value (Exclusion of Non-commercial Considerations) (Wales) Order (SI 2002/678)
- The Education (Capital Grants) (Wales) Regulations (SI 2002/679)
- The Income Tax (Employments and Electronic Communications) (Miscellaneous Provisions) Regulations (SI 2002/680)
- The Occupational and Personal Pension Schemes (Contracting-out) (Miscellaneous Amendments) Regulations (SI 2002/681)
- The Financial Services and Markets Act 2000 (Regulated Activities) (Amendment) Order (SI 2002/682)
- The Social Security (Industrial Injuries) (Dependency) (Permitted Earnings Limits) Order (SI 2002/683)
- The Social Security Benefits Up-rating Regulations (SI 2002/684)
- The Social Security (Hospital In-Patients) Amendment Regulations (SI 2002/685)
- The Companies (Disqualification Orders) (Amendment) Regulations (SI 2002/689)
- The Limited Liability Partnerships (Forms) Regulations (SI 2002/690)
- The Companies (Forms) (Amendment) Regulations (SI 2002/691)
- The Trade Marks (International Registration) (Amendment) Order (SI 2002/692)
- The Police Authorities (Best Value) Performance Indicators Order (SI 2002/694)
- The Police (Secretary of State's Objectives) Order (SI 2002/695)
- The Feedingstuffs (Zootechnical Products) (Amendment) (England, Scotland and Wales) Regulations (SI 2002/696)
- The Medicated Feedingstuffs (Amendment) (England, Scotland and Wales) Regulations (SI 2002/697)
- The Pensions Increase (Review) Order (SI 2002/699)
- The Retirement Benefits Schemes (Indexation of Earnings Cap) Order (SI 2002/700)

== 701–800 ==
- The Inheritance Tax (Indexation) Order (SI 2002/701)
- The Capital Gains Tax (Annual Exempt Amount) Order (SI 2002/702)
- The Social Security Contributions (Intermediaries) (Amendment) Regulations (SI 2002/703)
- The Financial Services and Markets Act 2000 (Permission and Applications) (Credit Unions etc.) Order (SI 2002/704)
- The Social Security Contributions (Intermediaries) (Northern Ireland) (Amendment) Regulations (SI 2002/705)
- The Income Tax (Cash Equivalents of Car Fuel Benefits) Order (SI 2002/706)
- The Income Tax (Indexation) Order (SI 2002/707)
- The Nurses, Midwives and Health Visitors (Professional Conduct) (Amendment No. 2) Rules 2002 Approval Order (SI 2002/708)
- The Community Legal Service (Financial) (Amendment) Regulations (SI 2002/709)
- The Legal Aid in Family Proceedings (Remuneration) (Amendment) Regulations (SI 2002/710)
- The Civil Legal Aid (General) (Amendment) Regulations (SI 2002/711)
- The Criminal Defence Service (General) (No. 2) (Amendment) Regulations (SI 2002/712)
- The Criminal Defence Service (Recovery of Defence Costs Orders) (Amendment) Regulations (SI 2002/713)
- The Criminal Defence Service (Funding) (Amendment) Order (SI 2002/714)
- The Local Authorities (Access to Meetings and Documents) (Period of Notice) (England) Order (SI 2002/715)
- The Local Authorities (Executive Arrangements) (Access to Information) (England) Amendment Regulations (SI 2002/716)
- The Workmen's Compensation (Supplementation) (Amendment) Scheme (SI 2002/718)
- The ABRO Trading Fund Order (SI 2002/719)
- The Disability Discrimination Code of Practice (Goods, Facilities, Services and Premises) (Appointed Day) Order (SI 2002/720)
- The Disability Discrimination Code of Practice (Goods, Facilities, Services and Premises) Revocation Order 2 (SI 2002/No.)
- The Swindon Primary Care Trust (Establishment) Order (SI 2002/722)
- The Kennet and North Wiltshire Primary Care Trust (Establishment) Order (SI 2002/723)
- The Ellesmere Port and Neston Primary Care Trust (Establishment) Order (SI 2002/724)
- The Cheshire West Primary Care Trust (Establishment) Order (SI 2002/725)
- The Eastern Cheshire Primary Care Trust (Establishment) Order (SI 2002/726)
- The Poole Primary Care Trust (Establishment) Order (SI 2002/727)
- The Birkenhead and Wallasey Primary Care Trust (Establishment) Order (SI 2002/728)
- The Southampton East Healthcare Primary Care Trust (Establishment) (Amendment) Order (SI 2002/729)
- The Rushmoor and Hart Primary Care Trust (Change of Name) Order (SI 2002/730)
- The North and East Devon Partnership National Health Service Trust Change of Name and (Establishment) Amendment Order (SI 2002/731)
- The Producer Responsibility Obligations (Packaging Waste) (Amendment) (England) Regulations (SI 2002/732)
- The Air Navigation (General) (Amendment) Regulations (SI 2002/733)
- The Gas (Standards of Performance) (Amendment) Regulations (SI 2002/741)
- The Electricity (Standards of Performance) (Amendment No. 2) Regulations (SI 2002/742)
- The Audit Commission (Borrowing Limit) Order (SI 2002/743)
- The Nitrate Sensitive Areas (Amendment) Regulations (SI 2002/744)
- The Vehicle Excise Duty (Immobilisation, Removal and Disposal of Vehicles) (Amendment) Regulations (SI 2002/745)
- The Removal and Disposal of Vehicles (England) (Amendment) Regulations (SI 2002/746)
- The Education (Bursaries for School Teacher Training) (England) (Amendment) Regulations (SI 2002/756)
- The Local Government (Best Value Performance Indicators) (Wales) Order (SI 2002/757)
- The Warm Homes and Energy Conservation Act 2000 (Commencement) (Wales) Order (SI 2002/758)
- The Aggregates Levy (General) Regulations (SI 2002/761)
- The Value Added Tax (Health and Welfare) Order (SI 2002/762)
- The Housing (Right to Buy) (Priority of Charges) (Wales) Order (SI 2002/763)
- The Sheep and Goats Identification and Movement (Interim Measures) (England) (Amendment) Order (SI 2002/764)
- The Electronic Money (Miscellaneous Amendments) Regulations (SI 2002/765)
- The Police (Promotion) (Amendment) Regulations (SI 2002/767)
- The Town and Country Planning (Fees for Applications and Deemed Applications) (Amendment) (England) Regulations (SI 2002/768)
- The Local Government (Early Termination of Employment) (Discretionary Compensation) (England and Wales) (Miscellaneous) Regulations (SI 2002/769)
- The Lands Tribunal (Fees) (Amendment) Rules (SI 2002/770)
- The Child Support (Northern Ireland Reciprocal Arrangements) Amendment Regulations (SI 2002/771)
- The Food (Figs, Hazelnuts and Pistachios from Turkey) (Emergency Control) (England) Regulations (SI 2002/773)
- The Food (Peanuts from China) (Emergency Control) (England) Regulations (SI 2002/774)
- The General Optical Council (Registration and Enrolment (Amendment) Rules) Order of Council (SI 2002/775)
- The National Criminal Intelligence Service (Secretary of State's Objectives) Order (SI 2002/778)
- The National Crime Squad (Secretary of State's Objectives) Order (SI 2002/779)
- The A21 Trunk Road (A2100 Junction Improvement John's Cross) (Detrunking) Order (SI 2002/780)
- The A21 Trunk Road (A2100 Junction Improvement John's Cross) Order (SI 2002/781)
- The Asylum Support (Repeal) Order (SI 2002/782)
- The Local Authorities Executive Arrangements (Functions and Responsibilities) (Amendment) (Wales) Regulations (SI 2002/783)
- The Advisory Committee for Wales (Environment Agency) Abolition Order (SI 2002/784)
- The Local Authorities (Capital Finance) (Rate of Discount for 2002/2003) (Wales) Regulations (SI 2002/785)
- The Hemp (Third Country Imports) Regulations (SI 2002/787)
- The Reciprocal Enforcement of Maintenance Orders (Designation of Reciprocating Countries) Order (SI 2002/788)
- The Maintenance Orders (Facilities for Enforcement) (Revocation) Order (SI 2002/789)
- The Sea Fisheries (Northern Ireland) Order (SI 2002/790)
- Adjacent Waters Boundaries (Northern Ireland) Order 2002 (SI 2002/791)
- The Naval, Military and Air Forces Etc. (Disablement and Death) Service Pensions Amendment Order (SI 2002/792)
- The International Criminal Court (Immunities and Privileges) Order (SI 2002/793)
- The Ministry of Agriculture, Fisheries and Food (Dissolution) Order (SI 2002/794)
- The Immigration (Designation of Travel Bans) (Amendment No. 2) Order (SI 2002/795)
- The Criminal Injuries Compensation (Northern Ireland) Order (SI 2002/796)
- The Abolition of the Central Council for Education and Training in Social Work Order (SI 2002/797)
- The Air Navigation (Environmental Standards) Order (SI 2002/798)
- The Telecommunication Services (Channel Islands) Order (SI 2002/799)
- The Scotland Act 1998 (Agency Arrangements) (Specification) (No. 2) Order (SI 2002/800)

== 801–900 ==
- The Scottish Administration (Offices) Order (SI 2002/801)
- The Local Authorities (Executive Arrangements) (Discharge of Functions) (Wales) Regulations (SI 2002/802)
- The Local Authorities (Executive Arrangements) (Modification of Enactments and Further Provisions) (Wales) Order (SI 2002/803)
- The Local Authorities (Executive and Alternative Arrangements) (Modification of Enactments and Other Provisions) (Wales) Order (SI 2002/808)
- The Finance Act 2001, section 16, (Appointed Day) Order (SI 2002/809)
- The Local Authorities (Alternative Arrangements) (Amendment) (Wales) Regulations (SI 2002/810)
- The Sheep and Goats Identification and Movement (Interim Measures) (Wales) (Amendment) Order (SI 2002/811)
- The Child Minding and Day Care (Wales) Regulations (SI 2002/812)
- The Producer Responsibility Obligations (Packaging Waste) (Amendment) (Wales) Regulations (SI 2002/813)
- The National Assistance (Assessment of Resources) (Amendment) (Wales) Regulations (SI 2002/814)
- The National Assistance (Sums for Personal Requirements) (Wales) Regulations (SI 2002/815)
- The Protection of Children and Vulnerable Adults and Care Standards Tribunal Regulations (SI 2002/816)
- The Social Security Administration Act 1992 (Amendment) Order (SI 2002/817)
- The Welfare Reform and Pensions Act 1999 (Commencement No. 15) Order (SI 2002/818)
- The Local Government Pension Scheme (Miscellaneous) Regulations (SI 2002/819)
- The Food (Peanuts from China) (Emergency Control) (Wales) Regulations (SI 2002/820)
- The Food (Figs, Hazelnuts and Pistachios from Turkey) (Emergency Control) (Wales) Regulations (SI 2002/821)
- The International Criminal Court Act 2001 (Enforcement of Fines, Forfeiture and Reparation Orders) (Amendment) Regulations (SI 2002/822)
- The Electricity (Exemption from the Requirement for a Generation Licence) (England and Wales) Order (SI 2002/823)
- The Artificial Insemination of Cattle (Animal Health) (Amendment) (England) Regulations (SI 2002/824)
- The Immigration (Transit Visa) (Amendment) Order (SI 2002/825)
- The Zimbabwe (Freezing of Funds, other Financial Assets or Economic Resources) Regulations (SI 2002/826)
- The General Osteopathic Council (Election of Members and Chairman of Council) Rules Order of Council (SI 2002/827)
- The Town and Country Planning (General Development Procedure) (Amendment) (England) Order (SI 2002/828)
- The Tax Credits Up-rating Order (SI 2002/829)
- The Social Security (Contributions) (Re-rating and National Insurance Funds Payments) Order (SI 2002/830)
- The Royal Mint Trading Fund (Extension and Variation) Order (SI 2002/831)
- The Court of Protection (Enduring Powers of Attorney) (Amendment) Rules (SI 2002/832)
- The Court of Protection (Amendment) Rules (SI 2002/833)
- The National Assembly for Wales (Representation of the People) (Amendment) Order (SI 2002/834)
- The Occupational and Personal Pension Schemes (Bankruptcy) (No. 2) Regulations (SI 2002/836)
- The Disabled Facilities Grants and Home Repair Assistance (Maximum Amounts) (Amendment) (Wales) Order (SI 2002/837)
- The Education (School Teachers' Pay and Conditions) Order (SI 2002/838)
- The Care Standards Act 2000 (Commencement No. 13) (England) Order (SI 2002/839)
- The Education (School Performance Targets) (England) (Amendment) Regulations (SI 2002/840)
- The Social Security (Miscellaneous Amendments) Regulations (SI 2002/841)
- The Social Security Benefit (Computation of Earnings) (Child Care Charges) Regulations (SI 2002/842)
- The TSE (England) Regulations (SI 2002/843)
- The Bail (Electronic Monitoring of Requirements) (Responsible Officer) Order (SI 2002/844)
- The Local Authority Remands (Electronic Monitoring of Conditions) (Responsible Officer) Order (SI 2002/845)
- The Transport Act 2000 (Commencement No. 8 and Transitional Provisions) (Amendment) Order (SI 2002/846)
- The Barnet, Enfield and Haringey Health Authority (Transfer of Trust Property) Order (SI 2002/847)
- The National Health Service (General Medical Services Supplementary List) (Amendment) Regulations (SI 2002/848)
- The European Specialist Medical Qualifications Amendment Regulations (SI 2002/849)
- The Northumberland Health Authority (Transfer of Trust Property) Order (SI 2002/850)
- The Mid-Sussex National Health Service Trust (Transfer of Trust Property) Order (SI 2002/851)
- The Wakefield Health Authority (Transfer of Trust Property) Order (SI 2002/852)
- The West Sussex Health Authority (Transfer of Trust Property) Order (SI 2002/853)
- The East Gloucestershire National Health Service Trust (Transfer of Trust Property) No. 2 Order (SI 2002/854)
- The Walsall Community Health National Health Service Trust (Transfer of Trust Property) Order (SI 2002/855)
- The Surrey and Sussex Healthcare National Health Service Trust (Transfer of Trust Property) Order (SI 2002/856)
- The Tameside and Glossop Community and Priority Services National Health Service Trust (Transfer of Trust Property) No. 2 Order (SI 2002/857)
- The Parkside National Health Service Trust (Transfer of Trust Property) No. 2 Order (SI 2002/858)
- The Parkside National Health Service Trust (Transfer of Trust Property) Order (SI 2002/859)
- The Buckinghamshire Health Authority (Transfer of Trust Property) No. 2 Order (SI 2002/861)
- The Buckinghamshire Health Authority (Transfer of Trust Property) No. 3 Order (SI 2002/862)
- The Buckinghamshire Health Authority (Transfer of Trust Property) No. 4 Order (SI 2002/863)
- The Gloucestershire Health Authority (Transfer of Trust Property) No. 2 Order (SI 2002/864)
- The Care Standards Act 2000 (Establishments and Agencies) (Miscellaneous Amendments) Regulations (SI 2002/865)
- The Bradford Community Health National Health Service Trust (Transfer of Trust Property) Order (SI 2002/866)
- The Sussex Weald and Downs National Health Service Trust (Transfer of Trust Property) Order (SI 2002/867)
- The Zimbabwe (Sale, Supply, Export and Shipment of Equipment) (Penalties and Licences) Regulations (SI 2002/868)
- The Sunderland Health Authority (Transfer of Trust Property) Order (SI 2002/869)
- The Merton, Sutton and Wandsworth Health Authority (Transfer of Trust Property) Order (SI 2002/870)
- The Merton, Sutton and Wandsworth Health Authority (Transfer of Trust Property) No. 2 Order (SI 2002/871)
- The Lambeth, Southwark and Lewisham Health Authority (Transfer of Trust Property) Order (SI 2002/872)
- The South West London Community National Health Service Trust (Transfer of Trust Property) Order (SI 2002/873)
- The Lifespan Health Care Cambridge National Health Service Trust (Transfer of Trust Property) Order (SI 2002/874)
- The West Kent Health Authority (Transfer of Trust Property) Order (SI 2002/875)
- The East Kent Health Authority (Transfer of Trust Property) Order (SI 2002/876)
- The South West London Community National Health Service Trust (Transfer of Trust Property) No. 2 Order (SI 2002/877)
- The Invicta Community Care National Health Service Trust (Transfer of Trust Property) Order (SI 2002/878)
- The Thames Gateway National Health Service Trust (Transfer of Trust Property) Order (SI 2002/879)
- The Health Professions Order 2001 (Consequential Amendments) Order (SI 2002/880)
- The Nursing and Midwifery Order 2001 (Consequential Amendments) Order (SI 2002/881)
- The Rabies (Importation of Dogs, Cats and Other Mammals) (Amendment) (Wales) Order (SI 2002/882)
- The Local Authorities (Capital Finance and Approved Investments) (Amendment) (Wales) Regulations (SI 2002/885)
- The Local Government (Whole Authority Analyses and Improvement Plans) (Wales) Order (SI 2002/886)
- The Abortion (Amendment) (England) Regulations (SI 2002/887)
- The National Health Service (Local Pharmaceutical Services and Pharmaceutical Services) Regulations (SI 2002/888)
- The Meat (Hazard Analysis and Critical Control Point) (England) Regulations (SI 2002/889)
- The Contaminants in Food (England) Regulations (SI 2002/890)
- The Lincolnshire Healthcare National Health Service Trust (Change of Name) Order (SI 2002/891)
- The Feeding Stuffs (Amendment) Regulations (SI 2002/892)
- The Wandsworth Primary Care Trust (Establishment) Order (SI 2002/893)
- The Walsall Primary Care Trust (Establishment) Order (SI 2002/894)
- The North Somerset Primary Care Trust (Establishment) Order (SI 2002/895)
- The Disqualification from Caring for Children (Wales) Regulations (SI 2002/896)
- The Dairy Produce Quotas (Wales) Regulations (SI 2002/897)
- The A5 London to Holyhead Trunk Road (Sketchley Meadow Junction Improvement) Order (SI 2002/898)

== 901–1000 ==
- The Regulatory Reform (Voluntary Aided Schools Liabilities and Funding) (England) Order (SI 2002/906)
- The Disease Control (Interim Measures) (England) (Amendment) Order (SI 2002/907)
- The Companies (Particulars of Usual Residential Address) (Confidentiality Orders) Regulations (SI 2002/912)
- The Limited Liability Partnerships (No. 2) Regulations (SI 2002/913)
- The Renewables Obligation Order (SI 2002/914)
- The Limited Liability Partnerships (Particulars of Usual Residential Address) (Confidentiality Orders) Regulations (SI 2002/915)
- The National Health Service (General Medical Services) (Amendment) (Wales) Regulations (SI 2002/916)
- The National Health Service (Optical Charges and Payments) and (General Ophthalmic Services) (Amendment) (Wales) Regulations (SI 2002/917)
- The National Health Service (General Dental Services) (Amendment) (Wales) Regulations (SI 2002/918)
- The Registration of Social Care and Independent Health Care (Wales) Regulations (SI 2002/919)
- The Care Standards Act 2000 (Commencement No. 8 (Wales) and Transitional, Savings and Consequential Provisions) Order (SI 2002/920)
- The Registration of Social Care and Independent Healthcare (Fees) (Wales) Regulations (SI 2002/921)
- The Council for Professions Supplementary to Medicine (Transfer of Staff and Property etc.) Order (SI 2002/922)
- The Nursing and Midwifery (Transfer of Staff and Property etc.) Order (SI 2002/923)
- The Plant Health (Forestry) (Great Britain) (Amendment) (No. 2) Order (SI 2002/927)
- Contracting Out (Local Education Authority Functions) (England) Order (SI 2002/928)
- The Food (Jelly Confectionery) (Emergency Control) (England) Regulations (SI 2002/931)
- The Medicines (Products Other Than Veterinary Drugs) (General Sale List) Amendment Order (SI 2002/933)
- The Rowley Regis and Tipton Primary Care Trust (Establishment) Order (SI 2002/938)
- The Eastern Birmingham Primary Care Trust (Establishment) Order (SI 2002/939)
- The Coventry Primary Care Trust (Establishment) Order (SI 2002/940)
- The Shropshire County Primary Care Trust (Establishment) Order (SI 2002/941)
- The South Warwickshire Primary Care Trust (Establishment) Order (SI 2002/942)
- The Telford and Wrekin Primary Care Trust (Establishment) Order (SI 2002/943)
- The Rugby Primary Care Trust (Establishment) Order (SI 2002/944)
- The Redditch and Bromsgrove Primary Care Trust (Establishment) Order (SI 2002/945)
- The Cannock Chase Primary Care Trust (Establishment) Order (SI 2002/946)
- The South Worcestershire Primary Care Trust (Establishment) Order (SI 2002/947)
- The Wolverhampton City Primary Care Trust (Establishment) Order (SI 2002/948)
- The Oldbury and Smethwick Primary Care Trust (Establishment) Order (SI 2002/949)
- The South Western Staffordshire Primary Care Trust (Establishment) Order (SI 2002/950)
- The East Staffordshire Primary Care Trust (Establishment) Order (SI 2002/951)
- The Animals and Animal Products (Import and Export) (England and Wales) (Amendment) (England) (No. 2) Regulations (SI 2002/956)
- The Wednesbury and West Bromwich Primary Care Trust (Establishment) Order (SI 2002/957)
- The Heart of Birmingham Teaching Primary Care Trust (Establishment) Order (SI 2002/958)
- The North Birmingham Primary Care Trust (Establishment) Order (SI 2002/959)
- The Medway Primary Care Trust (Establishment) Order (SI 2002/960)
- The Local Authorities (Elected Mayor and Mayor's Assistant) (England) Regulations (SI 2002/975)
- The Northampton Primary Care Trust (Establishment) Order (SI 2002/980)
- The Eastbourne Downs Primary Care Trust (Establishment) Order (SI 2002/981)
- The East Elmbridge and Mid Surrey Primary Care Trust (Establishment) Order (SI 2002/982)
- The Canterbury and Coastal Primary Care Trust (Establishment) Order (SI 2002/983)
- The North Surrey Primary Care Trust (Establishment) Order (SI 2002/984)
- The Horsham and Chanctonbury Primary Care Trust (Establishment) Order (SI 2002/985)
- The Guildford and Waverley Primary Care Trust (Establishment) Order (SI 2002/986)
- The Western Sussex Primary Care Trust (Establishment) Order (SI 2002/987)
- The East Surrey Primary Care Trust (Establishment) Order (SI 2002/988)
- The Adur, Arun and Worthing Primary Care Trust (Establishment) Order (SI 2002/989)
- The East Kent Coastal Primary Care Trust (Establishment) Order (SI 2002/990)
- The Brighton and Hove City Primary Care Trust (Establishment) Order (SI 2002/991)
- The Ashford Primary Care Trust (Establishment) Order (SI 2002/992)
- The Swale Primary Care Trust (Establishment) Order (SI 2002/993)
- The Crawley Primary Care Trust (Establishment) Order (SI 2002/994)
- The Woking Area Primary Care Trust (Establishment) Order (SI 2002/995)
- The Sussex Downs and Weald Primary Care Trust (Establishment) Order (SI 2002/996)
- The Northamptonshire Heartlands Primary Care Trust (Establishment) Order (SI 2002/997)
- The Shepway Primary Care Trust (Establishment) Order (SI 2002/998)
- The Lambeth Primary Care Trust (Establishment) Order (SI 2002/999)
- The Camden Primary Care Trust (Establishment) Order (SI 2002/1000)

== 1001–1100 ==
- The Lewisham Primary Care Trust (Establishment) Order (SI 2002/1001)
- The Islington Primary Care Trust (Establishment) Order (SI 2002/1002)
- The Southwark Primary Care Trust (Establishment) Order (SI 2002/1003)
- The Kensington and Chelsea Primary Care Trust (Establishment) Order (SI 2002/1004)
- The Brent Primary Care Trust (Establishment) Order (SI 2002/1005)
- The Westminster Primary Care Trust (Establishment) Order (SI 2002/1006)
- The Croydon Primary Care Trust (Establishment) Order (SI 2002/1007)
- The Teddington, Twickenham and Hamptons Primary Care Trust (Establishment) Amendment and Change of Name Order (SI 2002/1008)
- The Nelson and West Merton Primary Care Trust (Establishment) Amendment and Change of Name Order (SI 2002/1009)
- The Harrow Primary Care Trust (Establishment) Order (SI 2002/1010)
- The Pet Travel Scheme (Pilot Arrangements) (England) (Amendment) Order (SI 2002/1011)
- The Transport Act 2000 (Commencement No. 9 and Transitional Provisions) Order (SI 2002/1014)
- The Bus Service Operators Grant (England) Regulations (SI 2002/1015)
- Travel Concessions (Eligible Services) Order (SI 2002/1016)
- The A303 Trunk Road (Folly Bottom Junction) (Detrunking) Order (SI 2002/1029)
- The A303 Trunk Road (Folly Bottom Junction Improvement Slip Roads) Order (SI 2002/1030)
- The Borough of South Ribble (Electoral Changes) (Amendment) Order (SI 2002/1031)
- The District of Craven (Ribble Banks Parish Council) (Electoral Changes) Order (SI 2002/1032)
- The District of East Riding (Electoral Changes) (Amendment) Order (SI 2002/1033)
- The Borough of Milton Keynes (Electoral Changes) (Amendment) Order (SI 2002/1034)
- The District of Forest of Dean (Electoral Changes) (Amendment) Order (SI 2002/1035)
- The District of Babergh (Electoral Changes) (Amendment) Order (SI 2002/1036)
- The Insolvency Act 1986 (Amendment) Regulations (SI 2002/1037)
- The Disease Control (Interim Measures) (Wales) (Amendment) Order (SI 2002/1038)
- The Animals and Animal Products (Import and Export) (England and Wales) (Amendment) (Wales) (No. 2) Regulations (SI 2002/1039)
- The A282 Trunk Road (Dartford–Thurrock Crossing Charging Scheme) Order (SI 2002/1040)
- The Warrant Enforcement Staff Pensions Order (SI 2002/1043)
- The Greater London Authority (Declaration of Acceptance of Office) Order (SI 2002/1044)
- The Local Authorities (Executive Arrangements) (Modification of Enactments) (England) Order (SI 2002/1057)
- The A57 Trunk Road (A57/M60/M67 Denton Roundabout to Manchester City Boundary) (Detrunking) Order (SI 2002/1058)
- The Regulatory Reform (Golden Jubilee Licensing) Order (SI 2002/1062)
- The Offshore Installations (Safety Zones) Order (SI 2002/1063)
- Heathrow Express Railway Extension Order 2002 (SI 2002/1064)
- Piccadilly Line (Heathrow T5 Extension) Order 2002 (SI 2002/1065)
- Docklands Light Railway (Silvertown and London City Airport Extension) Order 2002 (SI 2002/1066)
- The Plant Health (England) (Amendment) Order (SI 2002/1067)
- The Police and Criminal Evidence Act 1984 (Visual Recording of Interviews) (Certain Police Areas) Order (SI 2002/1069)
- The Public Telecommunication System Designation (Fibernet UK Limited) Order (SI 2002/1070)
- The Public Telecommunication System Designation (Eurocall Limited) Order (SI 2002/1071)
- The Vehicle Excise Duty (Designation of Small Islands) (Amendment) Order (SI 2002/1072)
- The National Health Service (Clinical Negligence Scheme) Amendment Regulations (SI 2002/1073)
- The Value Added Tax (Amendment) Regulations (SI 2002/1074)
- The Geneva Conventions (Amendment) Act (Overseas Territories) Order (SI 2002/1076)
- The Overseas Territories (Zimbabwe) (Restrictive Measures) Order (SI 2002/1077)
- The Air Navigation (Jersey) (Amendment No. 2) Order (SI 2002/1078)
- The Education (Inspectors of Education and Training in Wales) Order (SI 2002/1079)
- The European Communities (Designation) (No. 2) Order (SI 2002/1080)
- The Waste Management Licensing (Amendment) (Wales) Regulations (SI 2002/1087)
- The Food (Jelly Confectionery) (Emergency Control) (Wales) Regulations (SI 2002/1090)
- The Housing (Right to Acquire) (Discount) Order (SI 2002/1091)
- The Radioactive Material (Road Transport) (Definition of Radioactive Material) Order (SI 2002/1092)
- The Radioactive Material (Road Transport) Regulations (SI 2002/1093)
- The Government of Further Education Corporations (Revocation) (England) Regulations (SI 2002/1094)
- The Health and Social Care Act 2001 (Commencement No. 8) Order (SI 2002/1095)
- The Criminal Justice and Police Act 2001 (Commencement No. 6) Order (SI 2002/1097)
- The Value Added Tax (Increase of Registration Limits) Order (SI 2002/1098)
- The Value Added Tax (Consideration for Fuel Provided for Private Use) Order (SI 2002/1099)
- The Value Added Tax (Reduced Rate) Order (SI 2002/1100)

== 1101–1200 ==
- The Value Added Tax (Construction of Buildings) Order (SI 2002/1101)
- The Value Added Tax (Buildings and Land) Order (SI 2002/1102)
- The Electricity and Gas (Determination of Turnover for Penalties) Order (SI 2002/1111)
- The South Stoke Primary Care Trust (Establishment) Amendment Order (SI 2002/1112)
- The North Stoke Primary Care Trust (Establishment) Amendment Order (SI 2002/1113)
- The Burntwood, Lichfield and Tamworth Primary Care Trust (Establishment) Amendment Order (SI 2002/1114)
- The Rushmoor and Hart Primary Care Trust (Change of Name) No. 2 Order (SI 2002/1115)
- The Central Derby Primary Care Trust (Establishment) Amendment Order (SI 2002/1116)
- The Tameside and Glossop Primary Care Trust (Establishment) Order (SI 2002/1117)
- The Torbay Primary Care Trust and the Teignbridge Primary Care Trust (Establishment) Amendment Order (SI 2002/1118)
- The Eastleigh and Test Valley South Primary Care Trust (Establishment) Order (SI 2002/1119)
- The Fareham and Gosport Primary Care Trust (Establishment) Order (SI 2002/1120)
- The Fenland Primary Care Trust (Establishment) Amendment Order (SI 2002/1121)
- The Northumberland Care Trust (Establishment) Order (SI 2002/1122)
- The Maidstone and Malling Primary Care Trust Change of Name and (Establishment) Amendment Order (SI 2002/1123)
- The Health Professions Order 2001 (Transitional Provisions) Order (SI 2002/1124)
- The Nursing and Midwifery Order 2001 (Transitional Provisions) Order (SI 2002/1125)
- The Bridgend (Cynffig, Cornelly and Pyle Communities) (Electoral Changes) Order (SI 2002/1129)
- The Gaming Clubs (Bankers' Games) (Amendment) Regulations (SI 2002/1130)
- The Artificial Insemination of Cattle (Animal Health) (Amendment) (Wales) Regulations (SI 2002/1131)
- The Social Security (Claims and Information) (Housing Benefit and Council Tax Benefit) Regulations (SI 2002/1132)
- The Bootle and Litherland Primary Care Trust (Establishment) Amendment Order (SI 2002/1133)
- The Devon County Council (Barnstaple Downstream Bridge) Scheme 2000 Confirmation Instrument (SI 2002/1134)
- The Magistrates' Courts (Extradition) (Amendment) Rules (SI 2002/1135)
- The Education (Birmingham College of Food, Tourism and Creative Studies) (Transfer to the Higher Education Sector) Order (SI 2002/1136)
- The Education (Bursaries for School Teacher Training) (England) (Amendment) (No. 2) Regulations (SI 2002/1137)
- The Value Added Tax (Amendment) (No. 2) Regulations (SI 2002/1142)
- The Football Spectators (World Cup Control Period) (No. 2) Order (SI 2002/1143)
- The Personal Protective Equipment Regulations (SI 2002/1144)
- The Immigration Appeals (Family Visitor) Regulations (SI 2002/1147)
- The Criminal Justice and Court Services Act 2000 (Commencement No. 9) Order (SI 2002/1149)
- The Police and Criminal Evidence Act 1984 (Codes of Practice) (Modifications to Code C and Code D) (Certain Police Areas) Order (SI 2002/1150)
- The Atomic Energy Authority (Special Constables) Order (SI 2002/1151)
- The Climate Change Levy (General) (Amendment) Regulations (SI 2002/1152)
- The Railways (Interoperability) (High-Speed) Regulations (SI 2002/1166)
- The Health Act 1999 (Commencement No. 12) Order (SI 2002/1167)
- The A6 Trunk Road (Derby to Stockport) (Detrunking) Order (SI 2002/1168)
- The Nurses, Midwives and Health Visitors (Amendment) Rules Approval Order (SI 2002/1169)
- The Health and Social Care Act 2001 (Commencement No. 8) (Amendment) Order (SI 2002/1170)
- The Education (Governors' Annual Reports) (England) (Amendment) Regulations (SI 2002/1171)
- The Education (School Information) (England) (Amendment) Regulations (SI 2002/1172)
- The Value Added Tax (Transport) Order (SI 2002/1173)
- The Bovines and Bovine Products (Trade) (Amendment) (Wales) Regulations (SI 2002/1174)
- The Care Standards Act 2000 (Commencement No. 9) (Wales) Order (SI 2002/1175)
- The Care Standards Act 2000 (Extension of Meaning of Social Care Worker) (Wales) Regulations (SI 2002/1176)
- The Radioactive Substances (Natural Gas) Exemption Order (SI 2002/1177)
- The A45 Trunk Road (Weedon Road, Upton To The M45/A45 Roundabout, Dunchurch) (Detrunking) Order (SI 2002/1178)
- The A38 Trunk Road (Worcestershire/Gloucestershire) (Detrunking) Order (SI 2002/1179)
- The A452 Trunk Road (B5011 Ogley Road Junction To The A4041 Queslett Road East/B4138 Thornhill Road Roundabout) (Detrunking) Order (SI 2002/1180)
- The A523 Trunk Road (Calton Moor to Cheshire Border) (Detrunking) Order (SI 2002/1181)
- The A516 Trunk Road (West of Derby) (Detrunking) Order (SI 2002/1182)
- The A523 Trunk Road (County of Cheshire) (Detrunking) Order (SI 2002/1183)
- The A523 Trunk Road (Metropolitan Borough of Stockport) (Detrunking) Order (SI 2002/1184)
- The A61 Trunk Road (Alfreton to Sheffield) (Detrunking) Order (SI 2002/1185)
- The A52 Trunk Road (Derby to Calton Moor) (Detrunking) Order (SI 2002/1186)
- The Education Development Plans (Wales) Regulations (SI 2002/1187)
- The Rail Vehicle Accessibility (Middleton Railway Drewry Car) Exemption Order (SI 2002/1188)

== 1201–1300 ==
- The Child Support (Miscellaneous Amendments) Regulations (SI 2002/1204)
- The A57 Trunk Road (M1 to A1) (Detrunking) Order (SI 2002/1205)
- The A606 Trunk Road (A52 to A46) (Detrunking) Order (SI 2002/1206)
- The A614 Trunk Road (Leapool to Ollerton and Blyth to Bawtry) (Detrunking) Order (SI 2002/1207)
- The A15 Trunk Road (North of Lincoln to North Lincolnshire Border) (Detrunking) Order (SI 2002/1208)
- The A15 Trunk Road (South of M180) (Detrunking) Order (SI 2002/1209)
- The A16 Trunk Road (Stamford to North East Lincolnshire) (Detrunking) Order (SI 2002/1210)
- The A17 Trunk Road (Newark-on-Trent to King's Lynn) (Detrunking) Order (SI 2002/1211)
- The A46 Trunk Road (North of Lincoln) (Detrunking) Order (SI 2002/1212)
- The A34 Trunk Road (Newtown, Great Wyrley, Staffordshire To The Southern Boundary Of The A34/A500 Queensway Roundabout, Staffordshire) (Detrunking) Order (SI 2002/1213)
- The A5011 Trunk Road (Linley Road) (Detrunking) Order (SI 2002/1214)
- The A449 Trunk Road (A5 Gailey Roundabout to the A34 Queensway, Stafford) (Detrunking) Order (SI 2002/1215)
- The Social Security Fraud Act 2001 (Commencement No. 5) Order (SI 2002/1222)
- The Town and Country Planning (Major Infrastructure Project Inquiries Procedure) (England) Rules (SI 2002/1223)
- The Products of Animal Origin (Third Country Imports) (England) Regulations (SI 2002/1227)
- The Cornwall Healthcare National Health Service Trust Change of Name and (Establishment) Amendment Order (SI 2002/1234)
- The Lincolnshire South West Primary Care Trust Change of Name Order (SI 2002/1235)
- The Insolvency Act 1986 (Amendment) (No. 2) Regulations (SI 2002/1240)
- The Immigration (Swiss Free Movement of Persons) (No. 3) Regulations (SI 2002/1241)
- The Financial Services and Markets Act 2000 (Administration Orders Relating to Insurers) Order (SI 2002/1242)
- The Blackpool, Fylde and Wyre Hospitals National Health Service Trust (Establishment) and the Blackpool, Wyre and Fylde Community Health Services National Health Service Trust and the Blackpool Victoria Hospital National Health Service Trust (Dissolution) Order (SI 2002/1243)
- The Cheshire and Wirral Partnership National Health Service Trust (Establishment) and the Wirral and West Cheshire Community National Health Service Trust (Dissolution) Order (SI 2002/1244)
- The Care Standards Act 2000 (Commencement No. 12) (England) Order (SI 2002/1245)
- The National Care Standards Commission (Children's Rights Director) Regulations (SI 2002/1250)
- The Manchester Mental Health and Social Care Trust (Establishment) Order (SI 2002/1251)
- The British Overseas Territories Act 2002 (Commencement) Order (SI 2002/1252)
- The TSE (England) (Amendment) Regulations (SI 2002/1253)
- The General Chiropractic Council (Election of Members and Chairman of Council) Rules Order (SI 2002/1263)
- The Water Industry (Scotland) Act 2002 (Directions in the Interests of National Security) Order (SI 2002/1264)
- The Beer and Excise Warehousing (Amendment) Regulations (SI 2002/1265)
- The Police and Criminal Evidence Act 1984 (Codes of Practice) (Visual Recording of Interviews) Order (SI 2002/1266)
- The Pressure Equipment (Amendment) Regulations (SI 2002/1267)
- The Coast Protection (Notices) (England) Regulations (SI 2002/1278)
- The Anti-terrorism, Crime and Security Act 2001 (Commencement No. 4) Order (SI 2002/1279)
- The Value Added Tax (Special Provisions) (Amendment) Order (SI 2002/1280)
- The Security of Pathogens and Toxins (Exceptions to Dangerous Substances) Regulations (SI 2002/1281)
- The Police Authorities (Selection Panel) (Amendment) Regulations (SI 2002/1282)
- The Rotherham Priority Health Services National Health Service Trust (Dissolution) Order (SI 2002/1293)
- The Barnsley Community and Priority Services National Health Service Trust (Dissolution) Order (SI 2002/1294)
- The Doncaster Healthcare National Health Service Trust (Establishment) Amendment Order (SI 2002/1295)
- The Southern Derbyshire Mental Health National Health Service Trust Change of Name and (Establishment) Amendment Order and the Community Health Care Service (North Derbyshire) National Health Service Trust (Dissolution) Order (SI 2002/1296)
- The Sheffield Children's Hospital National Health Service Trust Change of Name and (Establishment) Amendment Order (SI 2002/1297)
- The Regulation of Investigatory Powers (Prescription of Offices, Ranks and Positions) (Amendment) Order (SI 2002/1298)
- The Plant Health (Phytophthora ramorum) (England) Order (SI 2002/1299)

== 1301–1400 ==
- The Insolvency (Amendment) Rules (SI 2002/1307)
- The Insolvent Partnerships (Amendment) Order (SI 2002/1308)
- The Administration of Insolvent Estates of Deceased Persons (Amendment) Order (SI 2002/1309)
- The Financial Services and Markets Act 2000 (Financial Promotion and Miscellaneous Amendments) Order (SI 2002/1310)
- The National Health Service (Compensation for Premature Retirement) Regulations (SI 2002/1311)
- The Health and Social Care Act 2001 (Commencement No. 9) Order (SI 2002/1312)
- The South West Yorkshire Mental Health National Health Service Trust (Establishment) and the Wakefield and Pontefract Community National Health Service Trust (Dissolution) Order (SI 2002/1313)
- The A596 Trunk Road (Calva Brow Junction, Workington) Order (SI 2002/1315)
- The Education (Student Support) (Amendment) Regulations (SI 2002/1318)
- The Bradford District Care Trust (Establishment) and the Bradford Community Health National Health Service Trust (Dissolution) Order (SI 2002/1322)
- The National Health Service Trusts (Dissolution) Order (SI 2002/1323)
- The South of Tyne and Wearside Mental Health National Health Service Trust (Establishment) and the Priority Healthcare Wearside National Health Service Trust (Dissolution) Order (SI 2002/1324)
- The Primary Care Trusts (Dissolution) Order (SI 2002/1325)
- The National Health Service (Optical Charges and Payments) Amendment (No. 3) (England) Regulations (SI 2002/1326)
- The Greater Manchester (Light Rapid Transit System) (Trafford Depot) Order (SI 2002/1327)
- The Animal Gatherings (Interim Measures) (England) (Amendment) Order (SI 2002/1328)
- The Education (Student Loans) (Amendment) (England and Wales) Regulations (SI 2002/1329)
- The Education (Mandatory Awards) Regulations (SI 2002/1330)
- The Education (QCA Levy) (Amendment) Regulations (SI 2002/1331)
- The Tax Credits (Miscellaneous Amendments No. 3) Regulations (SI 2002/1333)
- The Tax Credits (Prescribed Period of Awards) Regulations (SI 2002/1334)
- The Wiltshire and Swindon Health Care National Health Service Trust (Dissolution) Order (SI 2002/1335)
- The National Health Service Trusts (Originating Capital) Order (SI 2002/1336)
- The West Kent National Health Service and Social Care Trust (Establishment) and the Thames Gateway National Health Service Trust and Invicta Community Care National Health Service Trust (Dissolution) Order (SI 2002/1337)
- The Bournewood Community and Mental Health National Health Service Trust Change of Name Order (SI 2002/1338)
- The Tax Credits (Prescribed Period of Awards) (Northern Ireland) Regulations (SI 2002/1339)
- The Tax Credits (Miscellaneous Amendments No. 2) (Northern Ireland) Regulations (SI 2002/1340)
- The Mid Yorkshire Hospitals National Health Service Trust (Establishment) and the Pinderfields and Pontefract Hospitals National Health Service Trust and the Dewsbury Health Care National Health Service Trust (Dissolution) Order (SI 2002/1341)
- The Northallerton Health Services National Health Service Trust (Dissolution) Order (SI 2002/1342)
- The Judicial Pensions (Pensions Appeal Tribunals) Order (SI 2002/1347)
- The Disease Control (Interim Measures) (England) (Amendment No. 2) Order (SI 2002/1348)
- The Sheep and Goat Identification and Movement (Interim Measures) (England) (Amendment) (No. 2) Order (SI 2002/1349)
- The Plant Health (Phytophthora ramorum) (Wales) Order (SI 2002/1350)
- The Road Traffic (Permitted Parking Area and Special Parking Area) (County of Hampshire) (District of Hart) Order (SI 2002/1351)
- The Road Traffic (Permitted Parking Area and Special Parking Area) (County of Hampshire) (Borough of Rushmoor) Order (SI 2002/1352)
- The Road Traffic (Permitted Parking Area and Special Parking Area) (City of Liverpool) Order (SI 2002/1353)
- The Sheep and Goats Identification and Movement (Interim Measures) (Revocation) (Wales) Regulations (SI 2002/1354)
- The Offshore Chemicals Regulations (SI 2002/1355)
- The Disease Control (Interim Measures) (Wales) (Amendment) (No. 2) Order (SI 2002/1356)
- The Sheep and Goats Identification and Movement (Interim Measures) (Wales) Order (SI 2002/1357)
- The Animal Gatherings (Interim Measures) (Wales) (Amendment) Order (SI 2002/1358)
- The Local Government Act 2000 (Commencement No. 3) (Wales) Order (SI 2002/1359)
- The Worcestershire Community and Mental Health National Health Service Trust Change of Name and (Establishment) Amendment Order (SI 2002/1360)
- The Brent, Kensington, Chelsea and Westminster Mental Health National Health Service Trust Change of Name and (Establishment) Amendment Order (SI 2002/1361)
- The West Sussex Health and Social Care National Health Service Trust (Establishment) and the Worthing Priority National Health Service Trust and Sussex Weald and Downs National Health Service Trust (Dissolution) Order (SI 2002/1362)
- The Brighton and Sussex University Hospitals National Health Service Trust (Establishment) and the Mid Sussex National Health Service Trust (Dissolution) Order (SI 2002/1363)
- The Sandwell and West Birmingham Hospitals National Health Service Trust (Establishment) and the City Hospital National Health Service Trust and Sandwell Healthcare National Health Service Trust (Dissolution) Order (SI 2002/1364)
- The Police (Retention and Disposal of Items Seized) Regulations (SI 2002/1372)
- The Public Telecommunication System Designation (AT&T Global Network Services (UK) B.V.) Order (SI 2002/1376)
- The Education (Listed Bodies) (England) Order (SI 2002/1377)
- The Tax Credits (Decisions and Appeals) (Northern Ireland) (Amendment) Regulations (SI 2002/1378)
- The Social Security and Child Support (Decisions and Appeals) (Miscellaneous Amendments) Regulations (SI 2002/1379)
- The Occupational and Personal Pension Schemes (Disclosure of Information) Amendment Regulations (SI 2002/1383)
- East Lancashire (Heywood Extension) Light Railway Order 2002 (SI 2002/1384)
- The Local Authorities (Executive Arrangements) (Decisions, Documents and Meetings) (Wales) (Amendment) Regulations (SI 2002/1385)
- The National Health Service (Charges for Drugs and Appliances) Amendment (No. 2) Regulations (SI 2002/1386)
- The Products of Animal Origin (Third Country Imports) (Wales) Regulations (SI 2002/1387)
- The North Stoke Primary Care Trust (Establishment) Amendment (No. 2) Order (SI 2002/1392)
- The South Stoke Primary Care Trust (Establishment) Amendment (No. 2) Order (SI 2002/1393)
- The School Teacher Appraisal (Wales) Regulations (SI 2002/1394)
- The A39 Trunk Road (Devon/Cornwall County Boundary to Indian Queens Cornwall) (Detrunking) Order (SI 2002/1395)
- The School Government (Terms of Reference) (Amendment) (Wales) Regulations (SI 2002/1396)
- The Secretaries of State for Education and Skills and for Work and Pensions Order (SI 2002/1397)
- The European Convention on Cinematographic Co-production (Amendment) Order (SI 2002/1398)
- The Dentists Act 1984 (Dental Auxiliaries) Order (SI 2002/1399)
- The Education (School Information) (Wales) (Amendment) Regulations (SI 2002/1400)

== 1401–1500 ==
- The School Governors' Annual Reports (Wales) (Amendment) Regulations (SI 2002/1401)
- The Brinsbury College (Dissolution) Order (SI 2002/1402)
- The Primary Care Trusts (Establishment) Amendment Order (SI 2002/1405)
- The Social Security (Attendance Allowance and Disability Living Allowance) (Amendment) (No. 2) Regulations (SI 2002/1406)
- The Gaming Clubs (Bankers' Games) (Amendment) (No. 2) Regulations (SI 2002/1407)
- The International Development Act 2002 (Commencement) Order (SI 2002/1408)
- The Financial Services and Markets Act 2000 (Consequential Amendments) (Taxes) Order (SI 2002/1409)
- The Lotteries (Variation of Monetary Limits) Order (SI 2002/1410)
- The Income Support (General) and Jobseeker's Allowance Amendment Regulations (SI 2002/1411)
- The Goods Vehicles (Community Authorisations) (Modification of the Road Traffic (Foreign Vehicles) Act 1972) Regulations (SI 2002/1415)
- The TSE (Wales) Regulations (SI 2002/1416)
- The Tax Credit (New Category of Child Care Provider) Regulations (SI 2002/1417)
- The Free Zone (Port of Tilbury) Designation Order (SI 2002/1418)
- The Deregulation (Correction of Birth and Death Entries in Registers or Other Records) Order (SI 2002/1419)
- The Bridgend (Cynffig, Cornelly and Pyle Communities)(Electoral Changes)(Amendment) Order (SI 2002/1432)
- The Education (Student Loans) (Amendment) (No. 2) (England and Wales) Regulations (SI 2002/1433)
- The Education (Teachers' Qualifications and Health Standards) (England) (Amendment) Regulations (SI 2002/1434)
- The Race Relations Act 1976 (General Statutory Duty: Code of Practice) Order (SI 2002/1435)
- The Protection of Children Act 1999 (Commencement No. 3) Order (SI 2002/1436)
- The Leicestershire and Rutland Healthcare National Health Service Trust Change of Name and (Establishment) Amendment Order (SI 2002/1437)
- The Health Service (Control of Patient Information) Regulations (SI 2002/1438)
- Commission Areas (West Mercia) Order (SI 2002/1440)
- The Welsh Language Schemes (Public Bodies) Order (SI 2002/1441)
- The Regulatory Reform (Carer's Allowance) Order (SI 2002/1457)
- The Disability Discrimination (Educational Institutions) (Alteration of Leasehold Premises) Regulations (SI 2002/1458)
- The Disability Discrimination (Designation of Educational Institutions) Order (SI 2002/1459)
- The Plant Protection Products (Amendment) (No. 2) Regulations (SI 2002/1460)
- The Home-Grown Cereals Authority (Rate of Levy) Order (SI 2002/1461)
- The Hydrocarbon Oil (Industrial Reliefs) Regulations (SI 2002/1471)
- The Animal By-Products (Identification) (Amendment) (Wales) Regulations (SI 2002/1472)
- The Merchant Shipping (Safety of Navigation) Regulations (SI 2002/1473)
- The Road Vehicles (Construction and Use) (Amendment) (No. 2) Regulations (SI 2002/1474)
- The Health and Social Care Act 2001 (Commencement No. 2) (Wales) Order (SI 2002/1475)
- The Meat (Hazard Analysis and Critical Control Point) (Wales) Regulations (SI 2002/1476)
- The Plant Health (Forestry) (Phytophthora ramorum) (Great Britain) Order (SI 2002/1478)
- The Veterinary Surgeons Act 1966 (Schedule 3 Amendment) Order (SI 2002/1479)
- The Stakeholder Pension Schemes (Amendment) Regulations (SI 2002/1480)
- The Office of Communications Act 2002 (Commencement No. 1) Order (SI 2002/1483)
- The Road Traffic (Permitted Parking Area and Special Parking Area) (County of Dorset) (District of Purbeck) Order (SI 2002/1484)
- The Road Traffic (Permitted Parking Area and Special Parking Area) (County of Dorset) (District of East Dorset) Order (SI 2002/1485)
- The Road Traffic (Permitted Parking Area and Special Parking Area) (County of Dorset) (District of West Dorset) Order (SI 2002/1486)
- The Street Works (Reinstatement) (Amendment) (England) Regulations (SI 2002/1487)
- The Gas (Connection Charges) (Amendment) Regulations (SI 2002/1488)
- The St. Helens and Knowsley Community Health National Health Service Trust (Dissolution) Order (SI 2002/1489)
- The South Buckinghamshire National Health Service Trust (Establishment) Amendment Order (SI 2002/1490)
- The South Tees Acute Hospitals National Health Service Trust (Establishment) Amendment Order (SI 2002/1491)
- The Community Healthcare Bolton National Health Service Trust (Dissolution) Order (SI 2002/1492)
- The Care Standards Act 2000 (Commencement No. 14 (England) and Transitional, Savings and Amendment Provisions) Order (SI 2002/1493)
- The Camden and Islington Mental Health National Health Service Trust (Establishment) Amendment Order (SI 2002/1494)
- The Eastbourne and County National Health Service Trust Change of Name and (Establishment) Amendment Order (SI 2002/1495)
- The Cheshire Community Healthcare National Health Service Trust (Dissolution) Order (SI 2002/1496)
- The North Mersey Community National Health Service Trust (Dissolution) Order (SI 2002/1497)
- The South Essex Mental Health and Community Care National Health Service Trust Change of Name and (Establishment) Amendment Order (SI 2002/1498)
- The Chester and Halton Community National Health Service Trust (Dissolution) Order (SI 2002/1499)
- The CommuniCare National Health Service Trust (Dissolution) Order (SI 2002/1500)

== 1501–1600 ==
- The Financial Services and Markets Act 2000 (Consequential Amendments and Transitional Provisions) (Credit Unions) Order (SI 2002/1501)
- The Value Added Tax (Cars) (Amendment) Order (SI 2002/1502)
- The Value Added Tax (Special Provisions) (Amendment) (No. 2) Order (SI 2002/1503)
- The Road Traffic (Permitted Parking Area and Special Parking Area) (County of Dorset) (District of North Dorset) Order (SI 2002/1504)
- The National Care Standards Commission (Fees and Frequency of Inspections) (Amendment) Regulations (SI 2002/1505)
- The National Health Service (Optical Charges and Payments) (Amendment) (No. 2) (Wales) Regulations (SI 2002/1506)
- The Seeds (Fees) (Amendment) (Wales) Regulations (SI 2002/1554)
- The Financial Services and Markets Act 2000 (Consequential Amendments) Order (SI 2002/1555)
- The Education (School Day and School Year) (Amendment) (No. 2) (Wales) Regulations (SI 2002/1556)
- The Anti-terrorism, Crime and Security Act 2001 (Commencement No. 5) Order (SI 2002/1558)
- The Landfill (England and Wales) Regulations (SI 2002/1559)
- The Public Telecommunication System Designation (Companhia Portuguesa Radio Marconi SA) Order (SI 2002/1560)
- The Public Telecommunication System Designation (United Networks Limited) Order (SI 2002/1561)
- The Public Telecommunication System Designation (T-Systems Limited) Order (SI 2002/1562)
- The Seeds (Fees) (Amendment) (England) Regulations (SI 2002/1563)
- The Merchant Shipping (Diving Safety) Regulations (SI 2002/1587)
- The Lincolnshire (Coroners' Districts) Order (SI 2002/1588)
- The Social Security Amendment (Students and Income-related Benefits) Regulations (SI 2002/1589)
- The Wireless Telegraphy (Exemption) (Amendment) Regulations (SI 2002/1590)
- The Regulatory Reform (Vaccine Damage Payments Act 1979) Order (SI 2002/1592)
- The Driving Licences (Exchangeable Licences) (Amendment) Order (SI 2002/1593)
- The A46 Trunk Road (Ashchurch Station Bridge) Order (SI 2002/1594)
- The A46 Trunk Road (Ashchurch Station Bridge) (Detrunking) Order (SI 2002/1595)
- The Income Tax (Benefits in Kind) (Exemption for Employment Costs resulting from Disability) Regulations (SI 2002/1596)
- The European Communities (Recognition of Qualifications and Experience) (Third General System) Regulations 2 (SI 2002/1597)
- The Charities (Exception From Registration) (Amendment) Regulations (SI 2002/1598)

== 1601–1700 ==
- The Food and Animal Feedingstuffs (Products of Animal Origin from China) (Emergency Control) (England) Regulations (SI 2002/1614)
- The Leeds Community and Mental Health Services Teaching National Health Service Trust (Change of Name) Order (SI 2002/1615)
- The National Health Service (Primary Care) Act 1997 (Commencement No. 8) Order (SI 2002/1616)
- The Rail Vehicle Accessibility (South Central Class 375/3 Vehicles) Exemption Order (SI 2002/1617)
- The Consular Fees Act 1980 (Fees) Order (SI 2002/1618)
- The Animal By-Products (Identification) (Amendment) (England) Regulations (SI 2002/1619)
- The Criminal Defence Service (Representation Order Appeals) (Amendment) Regulations (SI 2002/1620)
- The Road Traffic (Permitted Parking Area and Special Parking Area) (County of North Yorkshire) (Borough of Harrogate) Order (SI 2002/1621)
- The General Dental Council (Constitution) Order (SI 2002/1625)
- The Exempt Charities Order (SI 2002/1626)
- The Consular Fees Order (SI 2002/1627)
- The Air Navigation (Amendment) (No. 2) Order (SI 2002/1628)
- The Scotland Act 1998 (Modifications of Schedule 5) Order (SI 2002/1629)
- The Scotland Act 1998 (Transfer of Functions to the Scottish Ministers etc.) Order (SI 2002/1630)
- The Welfare of Farmed Animals (England) (Amendment) Regulations (SI 2002/1646)
- The Special Educational Needs and Disability Act 2001 (Commencement No. 3) Order (SI 2002/1647)
- The Electoral Fraud (Northern Ireland) Act 2002 (Commencement) Order (SI 2002/1648)
- The Non-Road Mobile Machinery (Emission of Gaseous and Particulate Pollutants) (Amendment) Regulations (SI 2002/1649)
- The Merchant Shipping (Miscellaneous Amendments) Regulations (SI 2002/1650)
- The M4 Motorway (Hillingdon and Hounslow) (Speed Limits) Regulations (SI 2002/1651)
- The Education (Recognised Bodies) (Wales) Order (SI 2002/1661)
- The European Union Extradition (Amendment) Regulations (SI 2002/1662)
- Further Education Teachers' Qualifications (Wales) Regulations (SI 2002/1663)
- The Education (Listed Bodies) (Wales) Order (SI 2002/1667)
- The Criminal Justice Act 1988 (Offensive Weapons) Order (SI 2002/1668)
- The Boroughs of Halton, Thurrock and Warrington (Changes to Years of Elections) Order (SI 2002/1670)
- The Dental Auxiliaries (Amendment) Regulations (SI 2002/1671)
- The M4 Motorway (London Borough of Hounslow) (Bus Lane) Order 1998 (Variation) Order (SI 2002/1672)
- The Late Payment of Commercial Debts (Interest) Act 1998 (Commencement No. 5) Order (SI 2002/1673)
- The Late Payment of Commercial Debts Regulations (SI 2002/1674)
- The Late Payment of Commercial Debts (Rate of Interest) (No. 3) Order (SI 2002/1675)
- The Horticultural Development Council (Amendment) Order (SI 2002/1676)
- The Plant Breeders' Rights (Fees) (Amendment) Regulations (SI 2002/1677)
- The A361 Trunk Road (M5 Motorway Junction 27 to Portmore Roundabout Devon) (Detrunking) Order (SI 2002/1678)
- The A39 Trunk Road (Portmore Roundabout to the Devon/Cornwall County Boundary) (Detrunking) Order (SI 2002/1679)
- The Education (Pupil Information) (England) (Amendment) Regulations (SI 2002/1680)
- The Financial Assistance for Environmental Purposes Order (SI 2002/1686)
- The Magistrates' Courts (Special Measures Directions) Rules (SI 2002/1687)
- The Crown Court (Special Measures Directions and Directions Prohibiting Cross-examination) Rules (SI 2002/1688)
- The Chemicals (Hazard Information and Packaging for Supply) Regulations (SI 2002/1689)
- The Cambridgeshire and Peterborough Mental Health Partnership National Health Service Trust (Establishment) and the Lifespan Health Care Cambridge National Health Service Trust and the North West Anglia Health Care National Health Service Trust (Dissolution) Amendment Order (SI 2002/1690)
- The State Pension Credit Act 2002 (Commencement No. 1) Order (SI 2002/1691)
- The Coventry Primary Care Trust (Transfer of Trust Property) Order (SI 2002/1692)
- The Regulation of Investigatory Powers (Interception of Communications: Code of Practice) Order (SI 2002/1693)
- The Rail Vehicle Accessibility (Isle of Wight Railway LCDR No. 2515 Vehicle) Exemption Order (SI 2002/1694)
- The Teesside Tertiary College (Dissolution) Order (SI 2002/1695)
- The Tax Credits (Miscellaneous Amendments No. 4) Regulations (SI 2002/1696)
- The Tax Credits (Miscellaneous Amendments No. 3) (Northern Ireland) Regulations (SI 2002/1697)
- The Motor Vehicles (Tests) (Amendment) (No. 2) Regulations (SI 2002/1698)
- The Rail Vehicle Accessibility (Virgin West Coast Class 390 Vehicles) Exemption Order (SI 2002/1699)
- The Wireless Telegraphy (Licence Charges) Regulations (SI 2002/1700)

== 1701–1800 ==
- The Jobseeker's Allowance (Joint Claims) Amendment Regulations (SI 2002/1701)
- The Pollution Prevention and Control (England and Wales) (Amendment) (No. 2) Regulations (SI 2002/1702)
- The Social Security (Jobcentre Plus Interviews) Regulations (SI 2002/1703)
- The Access to the Countryside (Provisional and Conclusive Maps) (England) Regulations (SI 2002/1710)
- Vehicular Access Across Common and Other Land (England) Regulations (SI 2002/1711)
- The North Derbyshire Tertiary College (Dissolution) Order (SI 2002/1714)
- The Leasehold Reform (Notices) (Amendment) (England) Regulations (SI 2002/1715)
- The Immigration Services Tribunal (Amendment) Rules (SI 2002/1716)
- The Social Security (Industrial Injuries) (Prescribed Diseases) Amendment Regulations (SI 2002/1717)
- The Local Government Act 2000 (Commencement No. 8) Order (SI 2002/1718)
- The Local Government Act 2000 (Model Code of Conduct) (Amendment) Order (SI 2002/1719)
- The Education (Grants in respect of Voluntary Aided Schools) (Amendment) (England) Regulations (SI 2002/1720)
- The Special Educational Needs and Disability Act 2001 (Commencement No. 4) Order (SI 2002/1721)
- The Local Government Commission for England (Winding-up) Order (SI 2002/1723)
- The Public Service Vehicles (Conduct of Drivers, Inspectors, Conductors and Passengers) (Amendment) Regulations (SI 2002/1724)
- The Food (Figs, Hazelnuts and Pistachios from Turkey) (Emergency Control) (Amendment) (Wales) Regulations (SI 2002/1726)
- The Tax Credits Act 2002 (Commencement No. 1) Order (SI 2002/1727)
- The Food (Peanuts from China) (Emergency Control) (Amendment) (Wales) Regulations (SI 2002/1728)
- The Local Authorities (Goods and Services) (Public Bodies) (Wales) Order (SI 2002/1729)
- The Environmental Protection (Restriction on Use of Lead Shot) (Wales) Regulations (SI 2002/1730)
- The Inheritance Tax (Delivery of Accounts) (Excepted Transfers and Excepted Terminations) Regulations (SI 2002/1731)
- The Inheritance Tax (Delivery of Accounts) (Excepted Settlements) Regulations (SI 2002/1732)
- The Inheritance Tax (Delivery of Accounts) (Excepted Estates) Regulations (SI 2002/1733)
- The Magistrates' Courts (Reciprocal Enforcement of Maintenance Orders) (Amendment) Rules (SI 2002/1734)
- The Non-Domestic Rating (Alteration of Lists and Appeals) (Amendment) (Wales) Regulations (SI 2002/1735)
- The Homelessness Act 2002 (Commencement) (Wales) Order (SI 2002/1736)
- The Education Standards Fund (England) (Amendment) Regulations (SI 2002/1738)
- The Youth Justice and Criminal Evidence Act 1999 (Commencement No. 7) Order (SI 2002/1739)
- The Safety of Sports Grounds (Designation) Order (SI 2002/1754)
- The Football Spectators (Seating) Order (SI 2002/1755)
- The Police (Amendment) Regulations (SI 2002/1758)
- The National Institute for Clinical Excellence (Amendment) Regulations (SI 2002/1759)
- The National Institute for Clinical Excellence (Establishment and Constitution) Amendment Order (SI 2002/1760)
- The Protection of Military Remains Act 1986 (Designation of Vessels and Controlled Sites) Order (SI 2002/1761)
- The Rail Vehicle Accessibility (South West Trains Class 458 Vehicles) Exemption (Amendment) Order (SI 2002/1762)
- The Social Security Amendment (Intercalating Students) Regulations (SI 2002/1763)
- The Disease Control (Interim Measures) (England) (Amendment No. 3) Order (SI 2002/1764)
- The Animal Gatherings (Interim Measures) (England) (Amendment) (No. 2) Order (SI 2002/1765)
- The Community Legal Service (Financial) (Amendment No. 2) Regulations (SI 2002/1766)
- The Pesticides (Maximum Residue Levels in Crops, Food and Feeding Stuffs) (England and Wales) (Amendment) Regulations (SI 2002/1767)
- The National Health Service (General Medical Services) Amendment (No. 3) Regulations 2 (SI 2002/1768)
- The Housing (Right to Buy) (Designated Rural Areas and Designated Regions) (England) Order (SI 2002/1769)
- The Dangerous Substances and Preparations (Safety) (Consolidation) (Amendment) Regulations (SI 2002/1770)
- The Wildlife and Countryside (Sites of Special Scientific Interest, Appeals) (Wales) Regulations (SI 2002/1772)
- The Hydrocarbon Oil (Marking) Regulations (SI 2002/1773)
- The Electronic Commerce Directive (Financial Services and Markets) Regulations (SI 2002/1775)
- The Financial Services and Markets Act 2000 (Regulated Activities) (Amendment) (No. 2) Order (SI 2002/1776)
- The Financial Services and Markets Act 2000 (Commencement of Mortgage Regulation) (Amendment) Order (SI 2002/1777)
- The Companies (Summary Financial Statement) Amendment Regulations (SI 2002/1780)
- The District of Wycombe (Electoral Changes) Order (SI 2002/1781)
- The Borough of Bournemouth (Electoral Changes) Order (SI 2002/1783)
- The District of Chiltern (Electoral Changes) Order (SI 2002/1784)
- The District of South Bucks (Electoral Changes) Order (SI 2002/1785)
- The Borough of Torbay (Electoral Changes) Order (SI 2002/1786)
- The Borough of Luton (Electoral Changes) Order (SI 2002/1787)
- The District of Aylesbury Vale (Electoral Changes) Order (SI 2002/1788)
- The Social Security (Electronic Communications) (Child Benefit) Order (SI 2002/1789)
- The Care Standards Act 2000 (Commencement No. 15 (England) and Transitional Provisions) (Amendment) Order (SI 2002/1790)
- The South Yorkshire Metropolitan Ambulance and Paramedic Service National Health Service Trust (Change of Name) Order (SI 2002/1791)
- The State Pension Credit Regulations (SI 2002/1792)
- The Countryside Access (Appeals Procedures) (Wales) Regulations (SI 2002/1794)
- The Control of Noise (Codes of Practice for Construction and Open Sites) (Wales) Order (SI 2002/1795)
- The Countryside Access (Provisional and Conclusive Maps) (Wales) Regulations (SI 2002/1796)
- The Feeding Stuffs (Amendment) (Wales) Regulations (SI 2002/1797)
- The Food and Animal Feedingstuffs (Products of Animal Origin from China) (Emergency Control) (Wales) Regulations (SI 2002/1798)
- The Homelessness Act 2002 (Commencement No. 1) (England) Order 2 (SI 2002/1799)

== 1801–1900 ==
- The National Health Service (General Medical Services) (Amendment) (No. 3) (Wales) Regulations (SI 2002/1804)
- The Plant Health (Amendment) (Wales) Order (SI 2002/1805)
- The Tir Mynydd (Wales) (Amendment) Regulations (SI 2002/1806)
- The Parliamentary Pensions (Amendment) Regulations (SI 2002/1807)
- The Road Traffic (Vehicle Emissions) (Fixed Penalty) (England) Regulations (SI 2002/1808)
- The Staffordshire County Council Trent and Mersey Canal Bridge Scheme 2001 Confirmation Instrument (SI 2002/1809)
- The Staffordshire County Council (Trent and Mersey Canal) Temporary Bridge Scheme 2001 Confirmation Instrument (SI 2002/1810)
- The Food for Particular Nutritional Uses (Addition of Substances for Specific Nutritional Purposes) (England) Regulations (SI 2002/1817)
- The Capital Allowances (Energy-saving Plant and Machinery) (Amendment) Order (SI 2002/1818)
- The European Communities (Designation) (No. 3) Order (SI 2002/1819)
- The Army, Air Force and Naval Discipline Acts (Continuation) Order (SI 2002/1820)
- The Education (Inspectors of Schools in England) Order (SI 2002/1821)
- The Anti-terrorism (Financial and Other Measures) (Overseas Territories) Order (SI 2002/1822)
- The Extradition (Overseas Territories) Order (SI 2002/1823)
- The Extradition (Overseas Territories) (Hong Kong) Order (SI 2002/1824)
- The Extradition (Overseas Territories) (Application to Hong Kong) Order (SI 2002/1825)
- The International Maritime Organisation (Immunities and Privileges) Order (SI 2002/1826)
- The Specialized Agencies of the United Nations (Immunities and Privileges) (Amendment) Order (SI 2002/1827)
- The United Nations and International Court of Justice (Immunities and Privileges) (Amendment) Order (SI 2002/1828)
- The European Convention on Extradition (Armenia and Georgia) (Amendment) Order (SI 2002/1829)
- The European Convention on Extradition (Fiscal Offences) (Amendment) Order (SI 2002/1830)
- The Extradition (Terrorist Bombings) Order (SI 2002/1831)
- The Immigration (Entry Otherwise than by Sea or Air) Order (SI 2002/1832)
- The Companies (Disqualification Orders) (Amendment No. 2) Regulations (SI 2002/1834)
- The Motor Vehicles (EC Type Approval) (Amendment) Regulations (SI 2002/1835)
- The Local Access Forums (England) Regulations (SI 2002/1836)
- The Penalties for Disorderly Behaviour (Amount of Penalty) Order (SI 2002/1837)
- The Penalties for Disorderly Behaviour (Form of Penalty Notice) Regulations (SI 2002/1838)
- The Education Maintenance Allowance (Pilot Areas) (Amendment) Regulations (SI 2002/1841)
- The Court of Appeal (Appeals from Proscribed Organisations Appeal Commission) Rules (SI 2002/1843)
- Court of Appeal (Appeals from Pathogens Access Appeal Commission) Rules (SI 2002/1844)
- The Pathogens Access Appeal Commission (Procedure) Rules (SI 2002/1845)
- The Local Government Pensions Scheme (Management and Investment of Funds) (Amendment) Regulations (SI 2002/1852)
- The Child Support (Temporary Compensation Payment Scheme) (Modification and Amendment) Regulations (SI 2002/1854)
- The Children (Leaving Care) (Amendment) (Wales) Regulations (SI 2002/1855)
- Local Education Authority (Post-Compulsory Education Awards)(Wales) Regulations (SI 2002/1856)
- The Education (Assembly Learning Grant Scheme) (Wales) Regulations (SI 2002/1857)
- The Protection of Wrecks (Designation) Order (SI 2002/1858)
- The Income-Related Benefits (Subsidy to Authorities) Amendment Order (SI 2002/1859)
- The Regulatory Reform (Housing Assistance) (England and Wales) Order (SI 2002/1860)
- The Offshore Installations (Emergency Pollution Control) Regulations (SI 2002/1861)
- The Criminal Justice and Court Services Act 2000 (Commencement No. 10) Order (SI 2002/1862)
- The Police and Criminal Evidence Act 1984 (Codes of Practice) (Modifications to Code C and Code D) (Certain Police Areas) (Amendment) Order (SI 2002/1863)
- The Wiltshire County Council (Semington Aqueduct) Scheme 2000 Confirmation Instrument (SI 2002/1868)
- The Seeds (Fees) (Amendment) (Wales) (No. 2) Regulations (SI 2002/1870)
- The Representation of the People (England and Wales)(Amendment) Regulations (SI 2002/1871)
- Representation of the People (Scotland) (Amendment) Regulations (SI 2002/1872)
- Representation of the People (Northern Ireland) (Amendment) Regulations (SI 2002/1873)
- The Insider Dealing (Securities and Regulated Markets) (Amendment) Order (SI 2002/1874)
- The Town and Country Planning (Use Classes) (Amendment) (Wales) Order (SI 2002/1875)
- The Town and Country Planning (Fees for Applications and Deemed Applications) (Amendment) (Wales) Regulations (SI 2002/1876)
- The Town and Country Planning (General Development Procedure) (Amendment) (Wales) Order (SI 2002/1877)
- The Town and Country Planning (General Permitted Development) (Amendment) (Wales) Order (SI 2002/1878)
- The Education (Assisted Places) (Amendment) (Wales) Regulations (SI 2002/1879)
- The Education (Assisted Places) (Incidental Expenses) (Amendment) (Wales) Regulations (SI 2002/1880)
- The National Health Service (General Dental Services) (Amendment) (Wales) (No. 2) Regulations (SI 2002/1881)
- The National Health Service (General Medical Services Supplementary List) (Wales) Regulations (SI 2002/1882)
- National Health Service (General Ophthalmic Services) (Amendment) (Wales) Regulations (SI 2002/1883)
- The Local Authorities (Capital Finance) (Approved Investments) (Amendment) (No. 2) (Wales) Regulations (SI 2002/1884)
- The Shellfish (Specification of Crustaceans) (Wales) Regulations (SI 2002/1885)
- The Contaminants in Food (Wales) Regulations (SI 2002/1886)
- The Parliamentary Pensions (Amendment) (No. 2) Regulations (SI 2002/1887)
- The Contracting Out (Functions of Local Authorities: Income-Related Benefits) Order (SI 2002/1888)
- The Companies (Disclosure of Information) (Designated Authorities) (No. 2) Order (SI 2002/1889)
- The Agricultural or Forestry Tractors and Tractor Components (Type Approval) (Amendment) Regulations (SI 2002/1890)
- The Agricultural or Forestry Tractors (Emission of Gaseous and Particulate Pollutants) Regulations (SI 2002/1891)
- The Ecclesiastical Judges, Legal Officers and Others (Fees) Order (SI 2002/1892)
- The Legal Officers (Annual Fees) Order (SI 2002/1893)
- The Parochial Fees Order (SI 2002/1894)
- The Local Authorities (Allowances for Members of County and County Borough Councils and National Park Authorities) (Wales) Regulations (SI 2002/1895)
- The National Health Service (General Medical Services) (Amendment) (Wales) (No. 2) Regulations (SI 2002/1896)
- The Undersized Spider Crabs (Wales) Order (SI 2002/1897)
- The Welfare of Farmed Animals (Wales) (Amendment) Regulations (SI 2002/1898)

== 1901–2000 ==
- The Gaming Clubs (Multiple Bingo) (Amendment) Regulations (SI 2002/1901)
- The Gaming Clubs (Charges) (Amendment) Regulations (SI 2002/1902)
- The Cinematograph (Safety) (Amendment) Regulations (SI 2002/1903)
- The Gaming Act (Variation of Monetary Limits) Order (SI 2002/1904)
- The Gaming (Bingo) Act (Variation of Monetary Limit) Order (SI 2002/1909)
- The Gaming Clubs (Licensing) (Amendment) Regulations (SI 2002/1910)
- The Wireless Telegraphy (Public Fixed Wireless Access Licences) Regulations (SI 2002/1911)
- The Commonhold and Leasehold Reform Act 2002 (Commencement No. 1, Savings and Transitional Provisions) (England) Order (SI 2002/1912)
- The Superannuation (Admission to Schedule 1 to the Superannuation Act 1972) Order (SI 2002/1913)
- The Vehicles (Crime) Act 2001 (Commencement No. 3) Order (SI 2002/1914)
- The Child Support Appeals (Jurisdiction of Courts) Order (SI 2002/1915)
- The Motor Salvage Operators Regulations (SI 2002/1916)
- The Motor Salvage Operators (Specified Offences) Order (SI 2002/1917)
- The Health and Social Care Act 2001 (Commencement No. 3) (Wales) Order (SI 2002/1919)
- The Abolition of the NHS Tribunal (Consequential Provisions) Regulations (SI 2002/1920)
- The Family Health Services Appeal Authority (Procedure) (Amendment) Rules (SI 2002/1921)
- The Food (Control of Irradiation) (Amendment) (England) Regulations (SI 2002/1922)
- The Contaminants in Food (England) (Amendment) Regulations (SI 2002/1923)
- The Hemp (Third Country Imports) (Amendment) Regulations (SI 2002/1924)
- The Agricultural Holdings (Units of Production) (England)Order (SI 2002/1925)
- The Finance Act 2002, section 5(6), (Appointed Date) Order (SI 2002/1926)
- The Aggregates Levy (Northern Ireland Tax Credit) Regulations (SI 2002/1927)
- The Biodiesel and Bioblend Regulations (SI 2002/1928)
- The Aggregates Levy (Registration and Miscellaneous Provisions) (Amendment) Regulations (SI 2002/1929)
- The Betting, Gaming and Lotteries Act 1963 (Schedule 4) (Amendment) Order (SI 2002/1930)
- The Regulation of Investigatory Powers (Maintenance of Interception Capability) Order (SI 2002/1931)
- The Regulation of Investigatory Powers (Covert Human Intelligence Sources: Code of Practice) Order (SI 2002/1932)
- The Regulation of Investigatory Powers (Covert Surveillance: Code of Practice) Order (SI 2002/1933)
- The Criminal Justice and Police Act 2001 (Amendment) Order (SI 2002/1934)
- The Value Added Tax (Acquisitions) Relief Order (SI 2002/1935)
- The Channel Tunnel Rail Link (Thames Tunnel Approach) Order (SI 2002/1943)
- The Court of Protection (Enduring Powers of Attorney) (Amendment No. 2) Rules (SI 2002/1944)
- The Schedule 7 to the Terrorism Act 2000 (Information) Order (SI 2002/1945)
- The Merseyrail Electrics Network Order (SI 2002/1946)
- The Public Telecommunication System Designation (Severn Trent Retail Services Limited) Order (SI 2002/1947)
- The Public Telecommunication System Designation (VTL (UK) Limited) Order (SI 2002/1948)
- The Public Telecommunication System Designation (Tweedwind Limited) Order (SI 2002/1949)
- The Social Security (Claims and Payments) Amendment (No. 2) Regulations (SI 2002/1950)
- The Queen Elizabeth II Conference Centre Trading Fund (Variation) Order (SI 2002/1951)
- The Local Authorities (Scheme for Elections of Specified Councils) (England) Order (SI 2002/1962)
- The Controlled Foreign Companies (Excluded Countries) (Amendment) Regulations (SI 2002/1963)
- The Northern Ireland Assembly (Elections) (Amendment) Order (SI 2002/1964)
- The Transport and Works (Applications and Objections Procedure) (England and Wales) (Amendment) Rules (SI 2002/1965)
- The Relief for Community Amateur Sports Clubs (Designation) Order (SI 2002/1966)
- The Corporation Tax (Finance Leasing of Intangible Assets) Regulations (SI 2002/1967)
- The Income Tax (Prescribed Deposit-takers) Order (SI 2002/1968)
- The Exchange Gains and Losses (Transitional Provisions and Savings) Regulations (SI 2002/1969)
- The Exchange Gains and Losses (Bringing into Account Gains or Losses) Regulations (SI 2002/1970)
- The European Single Currency (Taxes) (Amendment) Regulations (SI 2002/1971)
- The Open-ended Investment Companies (Tax) (Amendment) Regulations (SI 2002/1973)
- The Individual Savings Account (Amendment No. 2) Regulations (SI 2002/1974)
- The Stamp Duty and Stamp Duty Reserve Tax (Extension of Exceptions relating to Recognised Exchanges) Regulations (SI 2002/1975)
- The Education (Assisted Places) (Amendment) (England) Regulations (SI 2002/1979)
- Disability Discrimination (Services and Premises) (Amendment) Regulations (SI 2002/1980)
- Disability Discrimination (Prescribed Periods for Accessibility Strategies and Plans for Schools) (England) Regulations (SI 2002/1981)
- Education (Non-Maintained Special Schools) (England) (Amendment) Regulations (SI 2002/1982)
- The Education (Middle School) (England) Regulations (SI 2002/1983)
- The Education (Assisted Places) (Incidental Expenses) (Amendment) (England) Regulations (SI 2002/1984)
- The Special Educational Needs and Disability Tribunal (General Provisions and Disability Claims Procedure) Regulations (SI 2002/1985)
- The Directors' Remuneration Report Regulations (SI 2002/1986)
- The Employment Act 2002 (Commencement No. 1)Order (SI 2002/1989)
- The Insolvency Act 1986 (Amendment) (No. 3) Regulations (SI 2002/1990)
- Wear Valley Railway Order 2002 (SI 2002/1997)
- The Wye Navigation Order (SI 2002/1998)
- The National Minimum Wage Regulations 1999 (Amendment) Regulations (SI 2002/1999)
- The Falmouth & Truro Port Health Authority (Amendment) Order (SI 2002/2000)

== 2001–2100 ==
- The Care Standards Act 2000 (Commencement and Transitional Provisions) (Amendment) (England) Order (SI 2002/2001)
- The Education Act 2002 (Commencement No. 1)Order (SI 2002/2002)
- Education (London Residuary Body) (Property Transfer) (Amendment) Order (SI 2002/2003)
- The Education (Grants) (Music, Ballet and Choir Schools) (Amendment) (England) Regulations (SI 2002/2004)
- The Working Tax Credit (Entitlement and Maximum Rate) Regulations (SI 2002/2005)
- The Tax Credits (Definition and Calculation of Income) Regulations (SI 2002/2006)
- The Child Tax Credit Regulations (SI 2002/2007)
- The Tax Credits (Income Thresholds and Determination of Rates) Regulations (SI 2002/2008)
- The Immigration Services Commissioner (Registration Fee) Order (SI 2002/2011)
- The Road Traffic (Permitted Parking Area and Special Parking Area) (City of Nottingham) Order (SI 2002/2012)
- Electronic Commerce (EC Directive) Regulations 2002 (SI 2002/2013)
- The Tax Credits (Claims and Notifications) Regulations (SI 2002/2014)
- The Electronic Commerce Directive (Financial Services and Markets) (Amendment) Regulations (SI 2002/2015)
- The National Health Service (Local Pharmaceutical Services and Pharmaceutical Services) (No. 2) Regulations (SI 2002/2016)
- The Education (School Performance Information) (England) (Amendment) Regulations (SI 2002/2017)
- The Education Act 2002 (Commencement No. 1) (Amendment) Order (SI 2002/2018)
- The Social Security Amendment (Personal Allowances for Children and Young Persons) Regulations (SI 2002/2019)
- The Social Security Amendment (Carer Premium) Regulations (SI 2002/2020)
- The Financial Assistance for Environmental Purposes (No. 2) Order (SI 2002/2021)
- The Bus Service Operators Grant (Wales) Regulations (SI 2002/2022)
- The Travel Concessions (Eligible Services) Order (SI 2002/2023)
- The Transport Act 2000 (Commencement No. 2) (Wales) Order (SI 2002/2024)
- The Lancashire Teaching Hospitals National Health Service Trust (Establishment) and the Chorley and South Ribble National Health Service Trust and Preston Acute Hospitals National Health Service Trust (Dissolution) Order (SI 2002/2025)
- The Dual-Use Items (Export Control) (Amendment) (No. 2) Regulations (SI 2002/2033)
- Fixed-term Employees (Prevention of Less Favourable Treatment) Regulations 2002 (SI 2002/2034)
- The Part-time Workers (Prevention of Less Favourable Treatment) Regulations 2000 (Amendment) Regulations (SI 2002/2035)
- The European Communities (Recognition of Qualifications and Experience) (Third General System) (Amendment) Regulations (SI 2002/2036)
- The Appointment of Queen's Counsel Fees Order (SI 2002/2037)
- The Education (National Curriculum) (Exceptions at Key Stage 4) (England) (Amendment) Regulations (SI 2002/2048)
- The Criminal Justice and Police Act 2001 (Commencement No. 7) Order (SI 2002/2050)
- The Homelessness (Priority Need for Accommodation) (England) Order (SI 2002/2051)
- The Derelict Land Clearance Area (Combe Down Stone Mines, Bath) Order (SI 2002/2053)
- The Antarctic (Amendment) Regulations (SI 2002/2054)
- The Merchant Shipping (Medical Examination) Regulations (SI 2002/2055)
- The Civil Procedure (Amendment) Rules (SI 2002/2058)
- The Export of Goods (Control) (Amendment) Order (SI 2002/2059)
- The Animal Gatherings (Interim Measures) (Wales) (Amendment) (No. 2) Order (SI 2002/2060)
- The Disease Control (Interim Measures) (Wales) (Amendment No. 3) Order (SI 2002/2061)
- The Financing of Maintained Schools (England) (Amendment) Regulations (SI 2002/2062)
- The Education (Induction Arrangements for School Teachers) (Consolidation) (Amendment) (England) Regulations (SI 2002/2063)
- The Education (Grants etc.) (Dance and Drama) (England) (Amendment) Regulations (SI 2002/2064)
- The National Care Standards Commission (Fees and Frequency of Inspections) Amendment (No. 2) Regulations (SI 2002/2070)
- Education (Special Educational Needs) (City Colleges) (England) Regulations (SI 2002/2071)
- Education (Special Educational Needs) (Approval of Independent Schools) (Amendment) (England) Regulations (SI 2002/2072)
- The East Lancashire Hospitals National Health Service Trust (Establishment) and the Blackburn, Hyndburn and Ribble Valley Health Care National Health Service Trust and Burnley Health Care National Health Service Trust (Dissolution) Order (SI 2002/2073)
- Education (Teacher Student Loans) (Repayment etc.) Regulations (SI 2002/2086)
- Education (Student Loans) (Repayment) (Amendment) Regulations (SI 2002/2087)
- The Education (Student Support)(Amendment)(No. 2) Regulations (SI 2002/2088)
- The Education (Mandatory Awards) (Amendment) Regulations (SI 2002/2089)
- The Service Subsidy Agreements (Tendering) (England) Regulations (SI 2002/2090)
- The Street Works (Recovery of Costs) (England) Regulations (SI 2002/2091)
- The Street Works (Inspection Fees) (England) Regulations (SI 2002/2092)
- The Stakeholder Pension Schemes (Amendment No. 2) Regulations (SI 2002/2098)
- The Packaging, Labelling and Carriage of Radioactive Material by Rail Regulations (SI 2002/2099)

== 2101–2200 ==
- The Environmental Protection (Restriction on Use of Lead Shot) (England) (Amendment) Regulations (SI 2002/2102)
- The School Teachers' Remuneration Order (SI 2002/2103)
- The Education (Grants for Disabled Postgraduate Students) (Amendment) Regulations (SI 2002/2104)
- The Education (School Performance Targets) (England) (Amendment) (No. 2) Regulations (SI 2002/2105)
- The Community Health Councils (Amendment) Regulations (SI 2002/2106)
- The A1041 Trunk Road (540m South of Abbotts Road to 240m Southwest of The Centre of Carlton New Bridge) (Detrunking) Order (SI 2002/2107)
- The A65 Trunk Road (Thorlby Roundabout to North Yorkshire/City of Bradford Boundary) (Detrunking) Order (SI 2002/2108)
- The Education Act 2002 (Transitional Provisions etc.) (England) Regulations (SI 2002/2113)
- The Schools Forums (England) Regulations (SI 2002/2114)
- The Prison (Amendment) Rules (SI 2002/2116)
- The Young Offender Institution (Amendment) Rules (SI 2002/2117)
- The Local Authorities (Companies) (Amendment) (Wales) Order (SI 2002/2118)
- The Hamilton Oxford Schools Partnership Education Action Zone (Extension) Order (SI 2002/2123)
- The Greenwich-Time to Succeed Education Action Zone (Extension) Order (SI 2002/2124)
- The Merchant Shipping (Hours of Work) Regulations (SI 2002/2125)
- The Road Vehicles (Construction and Use) (Amendment) (No. 3) Regulations (SI 2002/2126)
- The Environmental Impact Assessment (Uncultivated Land and Semi-Natural Areas) (Wales) Regulations (SI 2002/2127)
- The Terrorism Act 2000 (Cessation of Effect of Section 76) Order (SI 2002/2141)
- The Greater London Magistrates' Courts Authority (Pensions) Order (SI 2002/2143)
- The Products of Animal Origin (Third Country Imports) (England) (Amendment) Regulations (SI 2002/2151)
- The Disease Control (Interim Measures) (England) (No. 2) Order (SI 2002/2152)
- The Sheep and Goats Identification and Movement (Interim Measures) (England) (No. 2) Order (SI 2002/2153)
- The Pigs (Records, Identification and Movement)(Interim Measures) (England) (No. 2) Order (SI 2002/2154)
- The Travel Documents (Fees) (Amendments) Regulations (SI 2002/2155)
- The Financial Services and Markets Act 2000 (Financial Promotion) (Amendment) (Electronic Commerce Directive) Order (SI 2002/2157)
- The Tax Credits (Claims) (Transitional Provision) (Amendment) Order (SI 2002/2158)
- The Child Minding and Day Care (Wales) (Amendment) Regulations (SI 2002/2171)
- The Working Tax Credit (Payment by Employers) Regulations (SI 2002/2172)
- The Tax Credits (Payments by the Board) Regulations (SI 2002/2173)
- The Health and Safety (Miscellaneous Amendments) Regulations (SI 2002/2174)
- The Offshore Safety (Miscellaneous Amendments) Regulations (SI 2002/2175)
- The Notification of New Substances (Amendment) Regulations (SI 2002/2176)
- The Road Traffic (Permitted Parking Area and Special Parking Area) (County of Essex) (Borough of Brentwood) Order (SI 2002/2183)
- The Road Traffic (Permitted Parking Area and Special Parking Area) (County of Essex) (Borough of Chelmsford) Order (SI 2002/2184)
- The Road Traffic (Permitted Parking Area and Special Parking Area) (County of Essex) (District of Epping Forest) Order (SI 2002/2185)
- The Road Traffic (Permitted Parking Area and Special Parking Area) (County of Essex) (Borough of Colchester) Order (SI 2002/2186)
- The Road Traffic (Permitted Parking Area and Special Parking Area) (County of Hampshire) (Borough of Basingstoke and Deane) Order (SI 2002/2187)
- The Road Traffic (Permitted Parking Area and Special Parking Area) (Metropolitan Borough of Bury) Order (SI 2002/2188)
- The Velindre National Health Service Trust (Establishment) Amendment (No. 2) Order (SI 2002/2199)
- The Football (Disorder) (Amendment) Act 2002 (Commencement) Order (SI 2002/2200)

== 2201–2300 ==
- The Fishing Vessels (Safety of 15–24 Metre Vessels) Regulations (SI 2002/2201)
- The National Health Service Reform and Health Care Professions Act 2002 (Commencement No. 1) Order (SI 2002/2202)
- The Social Security Amendment (Students and Income-related Benefits) (No. 2) Regulations (SI 2002/2207)
- The Education (Governors' Annual Reports) (England) (Amendment) (No. 2) Regulations (SI 2002/2214)
- The Care Standards Act 2000 (Commencement No. 16) (England) Order (SI 2002/2215)
- The Disability Discrimination Codes of Practice (Education) (Appointed Day) Order (SI 2002/2216)
- The Special Educational Needs and Disability Act 2001 (Commencement No. 5) Order (SI 2002/2217)
- The Education (School Teachers' Pay and Conditions) (No. 2) Order (SI 2002/2223)
- The Income Tax (Sub-contractors in the Construction Industry) (Amendment) Regulations (SI 2002/2225)
- The Long Residential Tenancies (Principal Forms) (Amendment) (England) Regulations (SI 2002/2227)
- The Public Trustee (Fees) (Amendment) Order (SI 2002/2232)
- The Witham, Braintree and Halstead Care Trust (Establishment) Order (SI 2002/2233)
- The Borough of Thurrock (Electoral Changes) Order (SI 2002/2234)
- The Borough of Medway (Electoral Changes) Order (SI 2002/2235)
- The City of Plymouth (Electoral Changes) Order (SI 2002/2236)
- The Borough of Warrington (Electoral Changes) Order (SI 2002/2237)
- The District of East Dorset (Electoral Changes) Order (SI 2002/2238)
- The District of North Dorset (Electoral Changes) Order (SI 2002/2239)
- The Borough of Blackpool (Electoral Changes) Order (SI 2002/2240)
- The Borough of Christchurch (Electoral Changes) Order (SI 2002/2241)
- The Borough of Halton (Electoral Changes) Order (SI 2002/2242)
- The District of West Berkshire (Electoral Changes) Order (SI 2002/2243)
- The Local Authorities (Goods and Services) (Public Bodies) (England) (No. 2) Order (SI 2002/2244)
- The State Pension Credit Act (Commencement No. 2) Order (SI 2002/2248)
- The Employment Act 2002 (Commencement No. 2) Order (SI 2002/2256)
- The Lancashire (Coroners' Districts) Order (SI 2002/2257)
- The Town and Country Planning (Fees for Applications and Deemed Applications) (Amendment No. 2) (Wales) Regulations (SI 2002/2258)
- The Housing (Scotland) Act 2001 (Housing Support Services Information) Order (SI 2002/2264)
- The Tonnage Tax (Training Requirement) (Amendment) Regulations (SI 2002/2265)
- The Origin of Goods (Petroleum Products) (Revocation) Regulations (SI 2002/2266)
- The Trade Union Ballots and Elections (Independent Scrutineer Qualifications) Order 1993 (Amendment) Order (SI 2002/2267)
- The Recognition and Derecognition Ballots (Qualified Persons) Order 2000 (Amendment) Order (SI 2002/2268)
- The Birmingham and the Black Country Health Authority (Transfer of Trust Property) Order (SI 2002/2269)
- The County Durham and Tees Valley Health Authority (Transfer of Trust Property) Order (SI 2002/2270)
- The Greater Manchester Health Authority (Transfer of Trust Property) Order (SI 2002/2271)
- The Leicestershire, Northamptonshire and Rutland Health Authority (Transfer of Trust Property) Order (SI 2002/2272)
- The North Central London Health Authority (Transfer of Trust Property) Order (SI 2002/2273)
- The North West London Health Authority (Transfer of Trust Property) Order (SI 2002/2274)
- The Northumberland, Tyne & Wear Health Authority (Transfer of Trust Property) Order (SI 2002/2275)
- The South East London Health Authority (Transfer of Trust Property) Order (SI 2002/2276)
- The South West Peninsula Health Authority (Transfer of Trust Property) Order (SI 2002/2277)
- The Thames Valley Health Authority (Transfer of Trust Property) Order (SI 2002/2278)
- The Trent Health Authority (Transfer of Trust Property) Order (SI 2002/2279)
- The West Yorkshire Health Authority (Transfer of Trust Property) Order (SI 2002/2280)
- The Avon, Gloucestershire and Wiltshire Health Authority (Transfer of Trust Property) Order (SI 2002/2281)
- The Cumbria and Lancashire Health Authority (Transfer of Trust Property) Order (SI 2002/2282)
- The Surrey and Sussex Health Authority (Transfer of Trust Property) Order (SI 2002/2283)
- The Mobile Telephones (Re-programming) Act 2002 (Commencement) Order (SI 2002/2294)
- The Food (Peanuts from China) (Emergency Control) (Wales) (No. 2) Regulations (SI 2002/2295)
- The Food (Figs, Hazelnuts and Pistachios from Turkey) (Emergency Control) (Wales) (No. 2) Regulations (SI 2002/2296)
- The Protection of Water Against Agricultural Nitrate Pollution (Amendment) (Wales) Regulations (SI 2002/2297)
- The Local Authorities (Companies) (Amendment) (England) Order (SI 2002/2298)
- The Local Authorities (Capital Finance) (Amendment) (England) Regulations (SI 2002/2299)
- The Disease Control (Interim Measures) (England) (No. 2) (Amendment) Order (SI 2002/2300)

== 2301–2400 ==
- The Education Action Forum (Proceedings) (Amendment) Regulations (SI 2002/2301)
- The Sheep and Goats Identification and Movement (Interim Measures) (Wales) (No. 2) Order (SI 2002/2302)
- The Pigs (Records, Identification and Movement) (Interim Measures) (Wales) (No. 2) Order (SI 2002/2303)
- The Disease Control (Interim Measures) (Wales) (No. 2) Order (SI 2002/2304)
- The Police Reform Act 2002 (Commencement No. 1) Order (SI 2002/2306)
- The Gaming Duty (Amendment) Regulations (SI 2002/2310)
- The Social Security (Incapacity) (Miscellaneous Amendments) (No. 2) Regulations (SI 2002/2311)
- The Attestation of Constables (Welsh Language) Order (SI 2002/2312)
- The Police (Property) (Amendment) Regulations (SI 2002/2313)
- The Social Security Amendment (Employment Programme) Regulations (SI 2002/2314)
- The Beef Labelling (Enforcement) (England) (Amendment) Regulations (SI 2002/2315)
- The Education Act 2002 (Modification of Provisions) (England) Regulations (SI 2002/2316)
- The Housing Benefit (General) Amendment Regulations (SI 2002/2322)
- The Social Fund (Miscellaneous Amendments) Regulations (SI 2002/2323)
- The Homelessness Act 2002 (Commencement No. 2 and Transitional Provisions) (England) Order (SI 2002/2324)
- The Bovines and Bovine Products (Trade) (Amendment) (Wales) (No. 2) Regulations (SI 2002/2325)
- The Police and Criminal Evidence Act 1984 (Department of Trade and Industry Investigations) Order (SI 2002/2326)
- The Occupational Pension Schemes (Member-nominated Trustees and Directors) Amendment Regulations (SI 2002/2327)
- The Food (Peanuts from China) (Emergency Control) (England) (No. 2) Regulations (SI 2002/2350)
- The Food (Figs, Hazelnuts and Pistachios from Turkey) (Emergency Control) (England) (No. 2) Regulations (SI 2002/2351)
- The National Health Service (Charges for Drugs and Appliances) Amendment (No. 3) Regulations (SI 2002/2352)
- The National Health Service (Miscellaneous Dental Charges Amendments) Regulations (SI 2002/2353)
- The Lottery Duty (Instant Chances) (Amendment) Regulations (SI 2002/2354)
- The Lottery Duty (Amendment) Regulations (SI 2002/2355)
- The Bovines and Bovine Products (Trade) (Amendment) (England) Regulations (SI 2002/2357)
- The Health and Social Care Act 2001 (Commencement No. 10) (England) Order (SI 2002/2363)
- The Plastic Materials and Articles in Contact with Food (Amendment) (England) Regulations (SI 2002/2364)
- The Social Security (Contributions) (Amendment No. 3) Regulations (SI 2002/2366)
- The Housing (Scotland) Act 2001 (Accommodation for Asylum-Seekers) Order (SI 2002/2367)
- The Borough of Weymouth and Portland (Electoral Changes) Order (SI 2002/2368)
- The City of Cambridge (Electoral Changes) Order (SI 2002/2369)
- The District of West Dorset (Electoral Changes) Order (SI 2002/2370)
- The Borough of Bracknell Forest (Electoral Changes) Order (SI 2002/2371)
- The Royal Borough of Windsor and Maidenhead (Electoral Changes) Order (SI 2002/2372)
- The Borough of Telford and Wrekin (Electoral Changes) Order (SI 2002/2373)
- The District of South Cambridgeshire (Electoral Changes) Order (SI 2002/2374)
- The National Health Service (Functions of Strategic Health Authorities and Primary Care Trusts and Administration Arrangements) (England) Regulations (SI 2002/2375)
- The Council for the Regulation of Health Care Professionals (Appointment etc.) Regulations (SI 2002/2376)
- The Vehicles (Crime) Act 2001 (Commencement No. 4) Order (SI 2002/2377)
- The Driving Licences (Exchangeable Licences) Order (SI 2002/2379)
- The Social Security (Miscellaneous Amendments) (No. 2) Regulations (SI 2002/2380)
- The Road Vehicles (Registration and Licensing) (Amendment) Regulations (Northern Ireland) (SI 2002/2381)
- The Road Vehicles (Registration and Licensing) (Amendment) Regulations (SI 2002/2382)
- The Eastbourne and County National Health Service Trust Change of Name and (Establishment) Amendment Order (No. 2) (SI 2002/2397)
- Strand Road, Preston Railway Order 2002 (SI 2002/2398)

== 2401–2500 ==
- The Coroners' Records (Fees for Copies) Rules (SI 2002/2401)
- The Income-related Benefits and Jobseeker's Allowance (Working Tax Credit and Child Tax Credit) (Amendment) Regulations (SI 2002/2402)
- The M60 Motorway (Junction 25) (Speed Limit) Regulations (SI 2002/2403)
- The African Development Fund (Additional Subscriptions) Order (SI 2002/2404)
- The Caribbean Development Bank (Further Payments) Order (SI 2002/2405)
- The Controlled Foreign Companies (Excluded Countries) (Amendment No. 2) Regulations (SI 2002/2406)
- The Buckinghamshire Hospitals National Health Service Trust (Establishment) and the South Buckinghamshire National Health Service Trust and Stoke Mandeville Hospital National Health Service Trust (Dissolution) Order (SI 2002/2419)
- The County Durham and Darlington Acute Hospitals National Health Service Trust (Establishment) and the North Durham Health Care National Health Service Trust and South Durham Health Care National Health Service Trust (Dissolution) Order (SI 2002/2420)
- The Aerodromes (Designation) (Facilities for Consultation) (Amendment) Order (SI 2002/2421)
- The A595 Trunk Road (Lillyhall to A66 Chapel Brow) Order (SI 2002/2422)
- The A6 Trunk Road (Levens Slip Road) (Detrunking) Order (SI 2002/2423)
- The A590 Trunk Road (Levens Slip Road) (Detrunking) Order (SI 2002/2424)
- The A69 Trunk Road (M6 to Carlisle City Boundary) (Detrunking) Order (SI 2002/2425)
- Road Vehicles (Testing) (Disclosure of Information) (Great Britain) Regulations (SI 2002/2426)
- The National Heritage (Territorial Waters Adjacent to England) Order (SI 2002/2427)
- The Education Act 2002 (Commencement No. 2 and Savings and Transitional Provisions) Order (SI 2002/2439)
- The Road Traffic (Permitted Parking Area and Special Parking Area) (County of Essex) (Borough of Brentwood) (Amendment) Order (SI 2002/2440)
- The Social Security (Claims and Payments and Miscellaneous Amendments) (No. 2) Regulations (SI 2002/2441)
- The Social Security Amendment (Personal Injury Payments) Regulations (SI 2002/2442)
- Genetically Modified Organisms (Deliberate Release) Regulations (SI 2002/2443)
- The General Dental Council (Election of Members) Rules Order of Council (SI 2002/2463)
- The General Dental Council (President of the Council) Rules Order of Council (SI 2002/2464)
- The Education (Nursery Education and Early Years Development) (England) (Amendment) Regulations (SI 2002/2466)
- The Offshore Installations (Safety Zones) (No. 2)Order (SI 2002/2467)
- The Metropolitan Police Authority (Civil Staff Pensions) Order (SI 2002/2468)
- The National Health Service Reform and Health Care Professions Act 2002 (Supplementary, Consequential etc. Provisions) Regulations (SI 2002/2469)
- The Brightlingsea Harbour Revision (Constitution) Order (SI 2002/2476)
- The National Health Service Reform and Health Care Professions Act 2002 (Commencement No. 2) Order (SI 2002/2478)
- The Dangerous Substances and Preparations (Safety) (Consolidation)(Amendment No. 2) Regulations (SI 2002/2479)
- The Disease Control (Interim Measures) (Wales) (No. 2) (Amendment) Order (SI 2002/2480)
- The Social Security Amendment (Carer's Allowance) Regulations (SI 2002/2497)
- The Statistics of Trade (Customs and Excise) (Amendment) Regulations (SI 2002/2498)

== 2501–2600 ==
- Teacher Training Agency (Additional Functions) (No. 2) (Amendment) Order (SI 2002/2513)
- The Road Traffic (Permitted Parking Area and Special Parking Area) (County of Cumbria) (District of Eden) Order (SI 2002/2520)
- The Irish Registers of Government Stock (Closure and Transfer) Order (SI 2002/2521)
- The Longley Park Sixth Form College (Incorporation) Order (SI 2002/2522)
- The Longley Park Sixth Form College (Government) Regulations (SI 2002/2523)
- The Social Fund Cold Weather Payments (General) Amendment Regulations (SI 2002/2524)
- The Police Authorities (Three-year Strategy Plans) Regulations (SI 2002/2526)
- The Police and Criminal Evidence Act 1984 (Visual Recording of Interviews) (Certain Police Areas) (No. 2) Order (SI 2002/2527)
- The Pollution Prevention and Control (Designation of Council Directives on Large Combustion Plants, Incineration of Waste and National Emission Ceilings) Order (SI 2002/2528)
- The Police (Amendment) (No. 2) Regulations (SI 2002/2529)
- The Zimbabwe (Freezing of Funds, other Financial Assets or Economic Resources) (Amendment) Regulations (SI 2002/2530)
- The National Assistance (Assessment of Resources) (Amendment) (No. 2) (England) Regulations (SI 2002/2531)
- The National Health Service Reform and Health Care Professions Act 2002 (Commencement) (Wales) Order (SI 2002/2532)
- The Atomic Energy (Americium) Order (SI 2002/2533)
- The Minibus and Other Section 19 Permit Buses (Amendment) Regulations (SI 2002/2534)
- The Public Service Vehicles (Operators' Licences) (Fees) (Amendment) Regulations (SI 2002/2535)
- The Public Service Vehicles (Registration of Local Services) (Amendment) (No. 2) (England and Wales)Regulations (SI 2002/2536)
- The Community Bus (Amendment) Regulations (SI 2002/2537)
- The Immigration (Short-term Holding Facilities) Regulations (SI 2002/2538)
- The Land Registration Rules (SI 2002/2539)
- The National Health Service (Out of Hours Medical Services) and National Health Service (General Medical Services) Amendment Regulations (SI 2002/2548)
- The Education (Pupil Referral Units) (Appeals Against Permanent Exclusion) (England) Regulations (SI 2002/2550)
- Medicines (Products for Animal Use—Fees) (Amendment) Regulations (SI 2002/2569)
- The Products of Animal Origin (Third Country Imports) (England) (Amendment) (No. 2) Regulations (SI 2002/2570)
- The General Medical Council (Fitness to Practise Committees) (Amendment) Rules Order of Council (SI 2002/2572)
- The Plant Health (Phytophthora ramorum) (England) (No. 2) Order (SI 2002/2573)
- The Northern Ireland Act 2000 (Suspension of Devolved Government) Order (SI 2002/2574)
- The Veterinary Surgery (Rectal Ultrasound Scanning of Bovines) Order (SI 2002/2584)
- The Lymington Harbour Revision (Constitution) Order (SI 2002/2586)
- The Northern Ireland Act 2000 (Modification) Order (SI 2002/2587)
- The Plant Health (Forestry) ("Phytophthora ramorum") (Great Britain) (No. 2) Order (SI 2002/2589)
- The Driving Licences (Designation of Relevant External Law) Order (SI 2002/2590)
- The District of Penwith (Electoral Changes) Order (SI 2002/2593)
- The District of Carrick (Electoral Changes) Order (SI 2002/2594)
- The District of Fenland (Electoral Changes) Order (SI 2002/2595)
- The District of East Cambridgeshire (Electoral Changes) Order (SI 2002/2596)
- The District of Harborough (Electoral Changes) Order (SI 2002/2597)
- The District of North West Leicestershire (Electoral Changes) Order (SI 2002/2598)
- The Borough of Melton (Electoral Changes) Order (SI 2002/2599)
- The Borough of Slough (Electoral Changes) Order (SI 2002/2600)

== 2601–2700 ==
- The District of Caradon (Electoral Changes) Order (SI 2002/2602)
- The District of North Cornwall (Electoral Changes) Order (SI 2002/2603)
- The District of Kerrier (Electoral Changes) Order (SI 2002/2604)
- The Nitrate Vulnerable Zones (Additional Designations) (England) (No. 2) Regulations (SI 2002/2614)
- The Countryside and Rights of Way Act 2000 (Commencement No. 3) (Wales) Order (SI 2002/2615)
- The National Health Service Trusts (Miscellaneous Dissolutions) Order (SI 2002/2616)
- The Basildon and Thurrock General Hospitals National Health Service Trust (Change of Name) Order (SI 2002/2617)
- The Felixstowe Dock and Railway Harbour Revision Order (SI 2002/2618)
- The Asylum Support (Amendment) (No. 2) Regulations (SI 2002/2619)
- The National Health Service Litigation Authority (Establishment and Constitution) Amendment Order (SI 2002/2621)
- The Children Act 1989 and the Care Standards Act 2000 (Miscellaneous Regulations) (Amendment) (Wales) Regulations (SI 2002/2622)
- The Freedom of Information (Additional Public Authorities) Order (SI 2002/2623)
- The Local Authorities (Goods and Services) (Public Bodies) (England) (No. 3) Order (SI 2002/2624)
- The Transfer of Functions (Transport, Local Government and the Regions) Order (SI 2002/2626)
- The Overseas Territories (Zimbabwe) (Restrictive Measures) (Amendment) Order (SI 2002/2627)
- The Somalia (United Nations Sanctions) Order (SI 2002/2628)
- The Somalia (United Nations Sanctions) (Channel Islands) Order (SI 2002/2629)
- The Somalia (United Nations Sanctions) (Isle of Man) Order (SI 2002/2630)
- The Somalia (United Nations Sanctions) (Overseas Territories) Order (SI 2002/2631)
- The Education (Inspectors of Education and Training in Wales) (No. 2) Order (SI 2002/2632)
- The Transfer of Functions (Civil Defence) Order (SI 2002/2633)
- The Consular Fees (No. 2) Order (SI 2002/2634)
- The European Convention on Cinematographic Co-production (Amendment) (No. 2) Order (SI 2002/2635)
- The Scotland Act 1998 (Cross-Border Public Authorities) (Adaptation of Functions etc.) (Amendment) Order (SI 2002/2636)
- The Turks and Caicos Islands Constitution (Amendment) Order (SI 2002/2637)
- The Pitcairn (Amendment) Order (SI 2002/2638)
- The Products of Animal Origin (Third Country Imports) (England) (Amendment) (No. 3) Regulations (SI 2002/2639)
- The Motor Cars (Driving Instruction) (Amendment) Regulations (SI 2002/2640)
- The Motor Vehicles (Driving Licences) (Amendment) Regulations (SI 2002/2641)
- The Public Telecommunication System Designation (Econet Satellite Services Limited) Order (SI 2002/2657)
- The Public Telecommunication System Designation (Gamma Telecommunications Limited) Order (SI 2002/2658)
- The Social Security (Claims and Payments and Miscellaneous Amendments) (No. 3) Regulations (SI 2002/2660)
- The Venture Capital Trust (Exchange of Shares and Securities) Regulations (SI 2002/2661)
- The Electricity Safety, Quality and Continuity Regulations (SI 2002/2665)
- The Treasure (Designation) Order (SI 2002/2666)
- Control of Asbestos at Work Regulations (SI 2002/2675)
- The Control of Lead at Work Regulations (SI 2002/2676)
- The Control of Substances Hazardous to Health Regulations (SI 2002/2677)
- The Town and Country Planning (Enforcement Notices and Appeals) (England) Regulations (SI 2002/2682)
- The Town and Country Planning (Enforcement) (Written Representations Procedure) (England) Regulations (SI 2002/2683)
- The Town and Country Planning (Enforcement) (Hearings Procedure) (England) Rules (SI 2002/2684)
- The Town and Country Planning (Enforcement) (Determination by Inspectors) (Inquiries Procedure) (England) Rules (SI 2002/2685)
- The Town and Country Planning (Enforcement) (Inquiries Procedure) (England) Rules (SI 2002/2686)
- The Road Vehicles (Display of Registration Marks) (Amendment) Regulations (SI 2002/2687)
- The Large Combustion Plants (England and Wales) Regulations (SI 2002/2688)
- The Social Security (Paternity and Adoption) Amendment Regulations (SI 2002/2689)
- The Social Security, Statutory Maternity Pay and Statutory Sick Pay (Miscellaneous Amendments) Regulations (SI 2002/2690)
- The Excise Duties (Personal Reliefs) (Revocation) Order (SI 2002/2691)
- The Excise Goods, Beer and Tobacco Products (Amendment) Regulations (SI 2002/2692)
- The Channel Tunnel (Alcoholic Liquor and Tobacco Products) (Amendment) Order (SI 2002/2693)

== 2701–2800 ==
- The Railways (Heathrow Express) (Exemptions) (Amendment) Order (SI 2002/2703)
- The General Chiropractic Council (Registration of Chiropractors with Foreign Qualifications) Rules Order of Council (SI 2002/2704)
- The Road Traffic (Permitted Parking Area and Special Parking Area) (County of Dorset) (Borough of Weymouth and Portland) Order (SI 2002/2705)
- The Financial Services and Markets Act 2000 (Fourth Motor Insurance Directive) Regulations (SI 2002/2706)
- The Financial Services and Markets Act 2000 (Variation of Threshold Conditions) Order (SI 2002/2707)
- The Insolvent Partnerships (Amendment) (No. 2) Order (SI 2002/2708)
- The Insolvency (Scotland) Amendment Rules (SI 2002/2709)
- The Insolvency Practitioners (Amendment) Regulations (SI 2002/2710)
- The Insolvency Act 2000 (Commencement No. 3 and Transitional Provisions) Order (SI 2002/2711)
- The Insolvency (Amendment) (No. 2) Rules (SI 2002/2712)
- The Education (Funding for Teacher Training) Designation (No. 2) Order (SI 2002/2713)
- The Information Tribunal (Enforcement Appeals) (Amendment) Rules (SI 2002/2722)
- The Pesticides (Maximum Residue Levels in Crops, Food and Feeding Stuffs) (England and Wales) (Amendment) (No. 2) Regulations (SI 2002/2723)
- The Terrorism Act 2000 (Proscribed Organisations) (Amendment) Order (SI 2002/2724)
- The Dart Harbour and Navigation Harbour Revision (Constitution) Order (SI 2002/2730)
- The Immigration and Asylum Appeals (One-Stop Procedure) (Amendment) Regulations (SI 2002/2731)
- The Plant Protection Products (Fees) (Amendment) Regulations (SI 2002/2733)
- The Road Vehicles (Registration and Licensing) Regulations (SI 2002/2742)
- The Motor Vehicles (EC Type Approval) (Amendment) (No. 2) Regulations (SI 2002/2743)
- The Insolvency Practitioners (Amendment) (No. 2) Regulations (SI 2002/2748)
- The Copyright, etc. and Trade Marks (Offences and Enforcement) Act 2002 (Commencement) Order (SI 2002/2749)
- The Police Reform Act 2002 (Commencement No. 3) Order (SI 2002/2750)
- The A1 Trunk Road (Stannington Grade Separated Junction) Order (SI 2002/2757)
- The Immigration (Transit Visa) (Amendment No. 2)Order (SI 2002/2758)
- The National Health Service Act 1977 and National Health Service and Community Care Act 1990 (Amendment) Regulations (SI 2002/2759)
- Education (London Residuary Body) (Property Transfer) (Amendment No. 2) Order (SI 2002/2760)
- The Olive Oil (Marketing Standards) (Amendment) Regulations (SI 2002/2761)
- The Plant Health ("Phytophthora ramorum") (Wales) (No. 2) Order (SI 2002/2762)
- The Financing of Maintained Schools (England) (Amendment No. 2) Regulations (SI 2002/2763)
- The Hackney Education Action Zone (Extension) Order (SI 2002/2764)
- The North East Derbyshire Coalfields Education Action Zone (Extension) Order (SI 2002/2765)
- The Southend Education Action Zone (Extension) Order (SI 2002/2766)
- The Telford and Wrekin Education Action Zone (Extension) Order (SI 2002/2767)
- The Dudley Partnership for Achievement Education Action Zone (Extension) Order (SI 2002/2768)
- The Widening Horizons–North Islington Education Action Zone (Extension) Order (SI 2002/2769)
- The East Manchester Education Action Zone (Extension) Order (SI 2002/2770)
- The Wythenshawe Education Action Zone (Extension) Order (SI 2002/2771)
- The New Horizons Kent–Somerset Virtual Education Action Zone (Extension) Order (SI 2002/2772)
- The Wednesbury Education Action Zone (Extension) Order (SI 2002/2773)
- The Hastings and St Leonards Education Action Zone (Extension) Order (SI 2002/2774)
- The Heart of Slough Education Action Zone (Extension) Order (SI 2002/2775)
- Dangerous Substances and Explosive Atmospheres Regulations 2002 (SI 2002/2776)
- The Removal and Disposal of Vehicles (Amendment)(No. 2) Regulations (SI 2002/2777)
- The Goods Vehicles (Licensing of Operators) (Fees) (Amendment) Regulations (SI 2002/2778)
- The Scottish Parliament (Elections etc.) Order (SI 2002/2779)
- The Magistrates' Courts (Sex Offender Orders) Rules (SI 2002/2782)
- The Crown Court (Amendment) Rules (SI 2002/2783)
- The Magistrates' Courts (Anti-Social Behaviour Orders) Rules (SI 2002/2784)
- The Criminal Defence Service (General) (No. 2) (Amendment No. 2) Regulations (SI 2002/2785)
- The Air Navigation (Dangerous Goods) Regulations (SI 2002/2786)
- The Special Educational Needs Tribunal (Amendment) Regulations (SI 2002/2787)
- Paternity and Adoption Leave Regulations 2002 (SI 2002/2788)
- The Maternity and Parental Leave (Amendment) Regulations (SI 2002/2789)
- The Housing Renewal Grants (Amendment) (Wales) Regulations (SI 2002/2798)
- The Housing Renewal Grants (Prescribed Forms and Particulars) (Amendment) (Wales) Regulations (SI 2002/2799)
- The Relocation Grants (Forms of Application) (Amendment) (Wales) Regulations (SI 2002/2800)

== 2801–2900 ==
- The Town and Country Planning (Costs of Inquiries etc.) (Standard Daily Amount) (Wales) Regulations (SI 2002/2801)
- The National Health Service (General Medical Services Supplementary List) (Wales) (Amendment), the National Health Service (General Medical Services) (Amendment) (Wales) (No. 3), the National Health Service (General Dental Services) (Amendment) (Wales) (No. 3) and the National Health Service (General Ophthalmic Services) (Amendment) (Wales) (No. 2) Regulations (SI 2002/2802)
- The Nationality, Immigration and Asylum Act 2002 (Commencement No. 1) Order (SI 2002/2811)
- The Freedom of Information Act 2000 (Commencement No. 2) Order (SI 2002/2812)
- The Value Added Tax (Drugs, Medicines, Aids for the Handicapped and Charities Etc.) Order (SI 2002/2813)
- The Education (Assembly Learning Grant Scheme) (Wales) (Amendment) Regulations (SI 2002/2814)
- The Immigration and Asylum Act 1999 (Commencement No. 11) Order (SI 2002/2815)
- The Carriers' Liability (Clandestine Entrants) (Level of Penalty: Code of Practice) Order (SI 2002/2816)
- The Carriers' Liability Regulations (SI 2002/2817)
- The Statutory Paternity Pay and Statutory Adoption Pay(Weekly Rates) Regulations (SI 2002/2818)
- The Statutory Paternity Pay and Statutory Adoption Pay (National Health Service Employees) Regulations (SI 2002/2819)
- The Statutory Paternity Pay and Statutory Adoption Pay (Administration) Regulations (SI 2002/2820)
- The Statutory Paternity Pay and Statutory Adoption Pay (Persons Abroad and Mariners) Regulations (SI 2002/2821)
- The Statutory Paternity Pay and Statutory Adoption Pay (General) Regulations (SI 2002/2822)
- The Social Security Benefit (Computation of Earnings) (Amendment) Regulations (SI 2002/2823)
- The Freedom of Information (Excluded Welsh Authorities) Order (SI 2002/2832)
- The Countryside and Rights of Way Act 2000 (Commencement No. 2) Order (SI 2002/2833)
- The Plastic Materials and Articles in Contact with Food (Amendment) (Wales) Regulations (SI 2002/2834)
- The Local Elections (Northern Ireland) (Amendment) Order (SI 2002/2835)
- The Employment (Northern Ireland) Order (SI 2002/2836)
- The Maximum Number of Judges Order (SI 2002/2837)
- The Reciprocal Enforcement of Maintenance Orders (Hague Convention Countries) (Variation) Order (SI 2002/2838)
- The Recovery Abroad of Maintenance (Convention Countries) Order (SI 2002/2839)
- The European Communities (Designation) (No. 4) Order (SI 2002/2840)
- The European Communities (Definition of Treaties) (Stabilisation and Association Agreement between the European Communities and their Member States, and the Former Yugoslav Republic of Macedonia) Order (SI 2002/2841)
- The Architects' Qualifications (EC Recognition) Order (SI 2002/2842)
- The Northern Ireland Act 1998 (Modification of Enactments) Order (SI 2002/2843)
- The Criminal Justice Act 1988 (Designated Countries and Territories) (Amendment) (No. 2) Order (SI 2002/2844)
- The Criminal Justice (International Co-operation) Act 1990 (Enforcement of Overseas Forfeiture Orders) (Amendment) (No. 2) Order (SI 2002/2845)
- The Drug Trafficking Act 1994 (Designated Countries and Territories) (Amendment) (No. 2) Order (SI 2002/2846)
- The Double Taxation Relief (Taxes on Income) (Lithuania) Order (SI 2002/2847)
- The Double Taxation Relief (Taxes on Income) (The United States of America) Order (SI 2002/2848)
- The Capital Gains Tax (Gilt-edged Securities) Order (SI 2002/2849)
- The Pet Travel Scheme (Pilot Arrangements) (England) (Amendment) (No. 2) Order (SI 2002/2850)
- The Value Added Tax Tribunals (Amendment) Rules (SI 2002/2851)
- The Education (Student Loans) (Repayment) (Amendment) (No. 2) Regulations (SI 2002/2859)
- The TSE (England) (Amendment) (No. 2) Regulations (SI 2002/2860)
- The National Health Service (Local Pharmaceutical Services Etc.) Regulations (SI 2002/2861)
- The Tobacco Advertising and Promotion Act 2002 (Commencement) Order (SI 2002/2865)
- The Employment Act 2002 (Commencement No. 3 and Transitional and Saving Provisions) Order (SI 2002/2866)
- The Financing of Maintained Schools (England) (Amendment No. 3) Regulations (SI 2002/2868)
- The Shrimp Fishing Nets Order (SI 2002/2870)
- The Building (Amendment) (No. 2) Regulations (SI 2002/2871)
- The Building (Approved Inspectors etc.) (Amendment) Regulations (SI 2002/2872)
- The Rail Vehicle Accessibility (Summerlee Tramcar No. 392) Exemption Order (SI 2002/2873)
- The Plant Protection Products (Amendment) (No. 3) Regulations (SI 2002/2874)
- The Poultry Breeding Flocks, Hatcheries and Animal By-Products (Fees) (England) Order (SI 2002/2875)
- The Borough of Blackburn with Darwen and the City of Peterborough (Changes to Years of Elections) Order (SI 2002/2876)
- The Local Authorities (Discretionary Expenditure Limits) (England) Order (SI 2002/2878)
- The Abortion (Amendment) (Wales) Regulations (SI 2002/2879)
- The Local Authorities (Operation of Different Executive or Alternative Arrangements) (Wales) Regulations (SI 2002/2880)
- The District of Blaby (Electoral Changes) Order (SI 2002/2882)
- The District of Chichester (Electoral Changes) Order (SI 2002/2883)
- The Borough of Worthing (Electoral Changes) Order (SI 2002/2884)
- The District of Arun (Electoral Changes) Order (SI 2002/2885)
- The Borough of Charnwood (Electoral Changes) Order (SI 2002/2886)
- The Borough of Poole (Electoral Changes) Order (SI 2002/2887)
- The Borough of Hinckley and Bosworth (Electoral Changes) Order (SI 2002/2888)
- The Borough of Oadby and Wigston (Electoral Changes) Order (SI 2002/2889)
- The District of Horsham (Electoral Changes) Order (SI 2002/2890)
- The District of Mid Sussex (Electoral Changes) Order (SI 2002/2891)
- The Borough of Reading (Electoral Changes) Order (SI 2002/2892)
- The Safety of Sports Grounds (Designation) (No. 2) Order (SI 2002/2893)
- The Companies (Fees) (Amendment No. 2) Regulations (SI 2002/2894)
- The Limited Liability Partnerships (Fees) (Amendment) Regulations (SI 2002/2895)
- The Education (Determination of Admission Arrangements) (Amendment) (England) Regulations (SI 2002/2896)
- The Education (School Information) (England) Regulations (SI 2002/2897)
- The Education (Variation of Admission Arrangements) (England) Regulations (SI 2002/2898)
- The Education (Admissions Appeals Arrangements) (England) Regulations (SI 2002/2899)
- The Education (Admission Forums) (England) Regulations (SI 2002/2900)

== 2901–3000 ==
- The Education (Objection to Admission Arrangements) (Amendment) (England) Regulations (SI 2002/2901)
- The Potatoes Originating in Egypt (Amendment) (England) Regulations (SI 2002/2902)
- The Education (Co-ordination of Admission Arrangements) (Primary Schools) (England) Regulations (SI 2002/2903)
- The Education (Co-ordination of Admission Arrangements) (Secondary Schools) (England) Regulations (SI 2002/2904)
- The Data Protection (Processing of Sensitive Personal Data) (Elected Representatives) Order (SI 2002/2905)
- The Value Added Tax (Amendment) (No. 3) Regulations (SI 2002/2918)
- The Social Security (Contributions) (Amendment No. 4) Regulations (SI 2002/2924)
- The Social Security Benefit (Computation of Earnings) (Amendment) (Northern Ireland) Regulations (SI 2002/2925)
- The Tax Credits (Appeals) Regulations (SI 2002/2926)
- The Employment Rights (Increase of Limits) (No. 2) Order (SI 2002/2927)
- The European Economic Interest Grouping (Fees) (Amendment No. 2) Regulations (SI 2002/2928)
- The Social Security (Contributions)(Amendment No. 5) Regulations (SI 2002/2929)
- The Income Tax (Indexation) (No. 2) Order (SI 2002/2930)
- The Income and Corporation Taxes Act 1988, Section 349B(3) Order (SI 2002/2931)
- The National Health Service Act 1977 and National Health Service and Community Care Act 1990 (Amendment) Amendment Regulations (SI 2002/2932)
- The Release of Short-Term Prisoners on Licence (Amendment of Requisite Period) Order (SI 2002/2933)
- The European Communities (Recognition of Professional Qualifications) (Second General System) Regulations (SI 2002/2934)
- The Children Act 1989 and the Care Standards Act 2000 (Miscellaneous Regulations) (Amendment) (Wales) (No. 2) Regulations (SI 2002/2935)
- The M11 Motorway (Junction 8) (Speed Limit) Regulations (SI 2002/2936)
- The Education (Teachers' Qualifications and Health Standards) (Wales) (Amendment) Regulations (SI 2002/2938)
- The Food for Particular Nutritional Uses (Addition of Substances for Specific Nutritional Purposes) (Wales) Regulations (SI 2002/2939)
- The General Teaching Council for Wales (Amendment) Order (SI 2002/2940)
- The Local Authorities (Executive Arrangements) (Discharge of Functions) (Amendment) (Wales) Regulations (SI 2002/2941)
- The Community Design (Fees) Regulations (SI 2002/2942)
- The Occupational Pensions (Revaluation) Order (SI 2002/2951)
- The Education Act 2002 (Commencement No. 3 and Savings and Transitional Provisions) Order (SI 2002/2952)
- The Education Act 2002 (Modification of Provisions) (No. 2) (England) Regulations (SI 2002/2953)
- The City of Plymouth (Scheme for Elections) Order (SI 2002/2954)
- The Office of Communications Act 2002 (Commencement No. 2) Order (SI 2002/2955)
- The Office of Communications (Membership) Order (SI 2002/2956)
- The Vehicles (Crime) Act 2001 (Commencement No. 5) Order (SI 2002/2957)
- The Employment Tribunals (Enforcement of Orders in Other Jurisdictions) (Scotland) Regulations (SI 2002/2972)
- The Functions of Traffic Wardens (Amendment) Order (SI 2002/2975)
- The General Commissioners and Special Commissioners (Jurisdiction and Procedure) (Amendment)Regulations (SI 2002/2976)
- The Vehicles Crime (Registration of Registration Plate Suppliers) (England and Wales) Regulations (SI 2002/2977)
- The School Companies Regulations (SI 2002/2978)
- The Notification of Installations Handling Hazardous Substances (Amendment) Regulations (SI 2002/2979)
- The Waste Incineration (England and Wales) Regulations (SI 2002/2980)
- The Public Service Vehicles Accessibility (Amendment) Regulations (SI 2002/2981)
- The District of Epping Forest (Electoral Changes)(Amendment) Order (SI 2002/2982)
- The District of Waveney (Electoral Changes) (Amendment) Order (SI 2002/2983)
- The District of Huntingdonshire (Electoral Changes) Order (SI 2002/2984)
- The District of Wyre Forest (Electoral Changes) Order (SI 2002/2985)
- The Borough of Redditch (Electoral Changes) Order (SI 2002/2986)
- The District of Wychavon (Electoral Changes) Order (SI 2002/2987)
- The City of Leicester (Electoral Changes) Order (SI 2002/2988)
- The District of Wokingham (Electoral Changes) Order (SI 2002/2989)
- The Borough of Crawley (Electoral Changes) Order (SI 2002/2990)
- The District of Adur (Electoral Changes) Order (SI 2002/2991)
- The Borough of Burnley (Electoral Changes) (Amendment) Order (SI 2002/2992)
- The Road Traffic (NHS Charges) Amendment (No. 2) Regulations (SI 2002/2995)
- The North Derbyshire Tertiary College (Designated Staff) Order (SI 2002/2996)
- The Crown Court (Amendment) (No. 2) Rules (SI 2002/2997)
- The Magistrates' Courts (Detention and Forfeiture of Cash) Rules (SI 2002/2998)

== 3001–3100 ==
- The Rail Vehicle Accessibility (Croydon Tramlink Class CR4000 Vehicles) Exemption (Amendment) Order (SI 2002/3001)
- The Rail Vehicle Accessibility (C2C Class 357/0 Vehicles) Exemption (Amendment) Order (SI 2002/3002)
- The Education (Funding for Teacher Training) Designation (No. 3) Order (SI 2002/3003)
- The Severn Bridges Tolls Order (SI 2002/3004)
- The Education (Bursaries for School Teacher Training) (England) (Revocation) Regulations (SI 2002/3005)
- The Retirement Benefits Schemes (Information Powers) (Amendment) Regulations (SI 2002/3006)
- The Commission for Patient and Public Involvement in Health (Functions) Regulations (SI 2002/3007)
- The Plastic Materials and Articles in Contact with Food (Amendment) (England) (No. 2) Regulations (SI 2002/3008)
- The Dangerous Substances and Preparations (Safety) (Consolidation) (Amendment No. 3) Regulations (SI 2002/3010)
- The Products of Animal Origin (Third Country Imports) (Wales) (Amendment) Regulations (SI 2002/3011)
- The Commonhold and Leasehold Reform Act 2002 (Commencement No. 1, Savings and Transitional Provisions) (Wales) Order (SI 2002/3012)
- The Arrangements for Placement of Children (General) and the Review of Children's Cases (Amendment) (Wales) Regulations (SI 2002/3013)
- The Travel Concessions (Eligibility) Act 2002 (Commencement) (Wales) Order (SI 2002/3014)
- The Proceeds of Crime Act 2002 (Commencement No. 1 and Savings) Order (SI 2002/3015)
- The Proceeds of Crime Act 2002 (Recovery of Cash in Summary Proceedings: Minimum Amount) Order (SI 2002/3016)
- The Quality Partnership Schemes (Existing Facilities) (Wales) Regulations (SI 2002/3017)
- The Immigration (Designation of Travel Bans) (Amendment No. 3) Order (SI 2002/3018)
- The State Pension Credit (Consequential, Transitional and Miscellaneous Provisions) Regulations (SI 2002/3019)
- The School Crossing Patrol Sign (England and Wales) Regulations (SI 2002/3020)
- The Non-Domestic Rating Contributions (England) (Amendment) Regulations (SI 2002/3021)
- The Medicines (Pharmacies) (Applications for Registration and Fees) Amendment Regulations (SI 2002/3024)
- The Immigration and Asylum Act 1999 (Part V Exemption: Relevant Employers) Order (SI 2002/3025)
- The Forest Reproductive Material (Great Britain) Regulations (SI 2002/3026)
- The Value Added Tax (Amendment) (No. 4) Regulations (SI 2002/3027)
- The Finance Act 2002, section 22, (Appointed Day) Order (SI 2002/3028)
- The Road User Charging (Enforcement of Charging Scheme Penalty Charges) (England and Wales) Regulations (SI 2002/3029)
- The Criminal Justice and Police Act 2001 (Commencement No. 8) Order (SI 2002/3032)
- The Civil Legal Aid (General) (Amendment No. 2) Regulations (SI 2002/3033)
- The Tax Credits (Administrative Arrangements) Regulations (SI 2002/3036)
- The Port of Larne (Pilotage Functions) Order (SI 2002/3037)
- The Commission for Patient and Public Involvement in Health (Membership and Procedure) Regulations (SI 2002/3038)
- The Counter Fraud and Security Management Service (Establishment and Constitution) Order (SI 2002/3039)
- The Counter Fraud and Security Management Service Regulations (SI 2002/3040)
- The Tobacco Products (Manufacture, Presentation and Sale) (Safety) Regulations (SI 2002/3041)
- The Other Fuel Substitutes (Rates of Excise Duty etc.) (Amendment) Order (SI 2002/3042)
- The Air Quality (England) (Amendment) Regulations (SI 2002/3043)
- The Animal Health Act 2002 (Commencement) Order (SI 2002/3044)
- The Sale and Supply of Goods to Consumers Regulations (SI 2002/3045)
- The Smoke Control Areas (Authorised Fuels) (England) (Amendment) Regulations (SI 2002/3046)
- The Statutory Payment Schemes (Electronic Communications) Regulations (SI 2002/3047)
- The Local Authority (Overview and Scrutiny Committees Health Scrutiny Functions) Regulations (SI 2002/3048)
- The Police (Retention and Disposal of Motor Vehicles) Regulations (SI 2002/3049)
- The Postal Services (EC Directive) Regulations (SI 2002/3050)
- The European Communities (Recognition of Professional Qualifications) (Amendment) Regulations (SI 2002/3051)
- The Contracting Out (Functions in Relation to Applications for Patents) Order (SI 2002/3052)
- The National Assembly for Wales (Returning Officers' Charges) Order (SI 2002/3053)
- The Non-Domestic Rating Contributions (Wales) (Amendment) Regulations (SI 2002/3054)
- The Proceeds of Crime Act 2002 (Commencement No. 2) Order (SI 2002/3055)
- The Finance Act 2002, section 6, (Appointed Day) Order (SI 2002/3056)
- The Hydrocarbon Oil (Registered Dealers in Controlled Oil) Regulations (SI 2002/3057)
- The Teachers’ Pensions (Amendment) Regulations (SI 2002/3058)
- The Education (Student Support) (Amendment) (No. 3) Regulations (SI 2002/3059)
- The Education (Mandatory Awards) (Amendment) (No. 2) Regulations (SI 2002/3060)
- The European Communities (Rights against Insurers) Regulations (SI 2002/3061)
- The Potato Industry Development Council (Amendment) Order (SI 2002/3062)
- Langley Junior School (Change to School Session Times) Order (SI 2002/3063)
- The Jobseeker's Allowance (Amendment) Regulations (SI 2002/3072)
- The Police and Criminal Evidence Act 1984 (Codes of Practice) (Statutory Powers of Stop and Search) Order (SI 2002/3075)
- The Registration of Births, Deaths and Marriages (Fees) Order (SI 2002/3076)
- The Withholding and Withdrawal of Support (Travel Assistance and Temporary Accommodation) Regulations (SI 2002/3078)
- The Zoo Licensing Act 1981 (Amendment) (England and Wales) Regulations (SI 2002/3080)
- The Companies (Principal Business Activities) (Amendment) Regulations (SI 2002/3081)
- The Measuring Instruments (EC Requirements) (Electrical Energy Meters) (Amendment) Regulations (SI 2002/3082)
- The Judicial Pensions and Retirement Act 1993 (Certain Qualifying Judicial Offices) (Amendment) Order (SI 2002/3083)
- The Hertfordshire (Coroners' Districts) Order (SI 2002/3084)
- The Camborne, Pool and Redruth Success Zone Education Action Zone (Extension) Order (SI 2002/3085)
- The Peterlee Education Action Zone (Extension) Order (SI 2002/3086)
- The Easington and Seaham Education Action Zone (Extension) Order (SI 2002/3087)
- The Dingle Granby Toxteth Education Action Zone (Extension) Order (SI 2002/3088)
- The Sunderland Building Our Future Education Action Zone (Extension) Order (SI 2002/3089)
- The Learning Together East Cleveland Education Action Zone (Extension) Order (SI 2002/3090)
- The Wolverhampton Education Action Zone (Extension) Order (SI 2002/3091)
- The North Gillingham Education Action Zone (Extension) Order (SI 2002/3092)
- The Community Learning Partnership Barrow-in-Furness Education Action Zone (Extension) Order (SI 2002/3093)
- The Leigh Park Education Action Zone (Extension) Order (SI 2002/3094)
- The Ashington Education Action Zone (Extension) Order (SI 2002/3095)
- The Breaking the Cycle Bridgewater Education Action Zone (Extension) Order (SI 2002/3096)
- The Rainbow Education Action Zone in Stoke-on-Trent (Extension) Order (SI 2002/3097)
- The Bolton Education Action Zone (Extension) Order (SI 2002/3098)
- The Coventry Millennium Education Action Zone (Extension) Order (SI 2002/3099)
- The Downham and Bellingham Education Action Zone (Extension) Order (SI 2002/3100)

== 3101–3200 ==
- The Epicentre LEAP Ellesmere Port Cheshire Education Action Zone (Extension) Order (SI 2002/3101)
- The Clacton and Harwich Education Action Zone (Extension) Order (SI 2002/3102)
- The Challenge for Corby Education Action Zone (Extension) Order (SI 2002/3103)
- The Action for Learning Partnership, Bedford Education Action Zone (Extension) Order (SI 2002/3104)
- The Withernsea and Southern Holderness Rural Achievement Education Action Zone (Extension) Order (SI 2002/3105)
- The Speke Garston Excellent Education Action Zone (Extension) Order (SI 2002/3106)
- The South Bradford Community Learning Partnership Education Action Zone (Extension) Order (SI 2002/3107)
- The Gloucester Education Achievement Zone (Extension) Order (SI 2002/3108)
- The Wakefield Community Learning Partnership Education Action Zone (Extension) Order (SI 2002/3109)
- The Asylum Support (Amendment) (No. 3) Regulations (SI 2002/3110)
- The Race Relations Act 1976 (General Statutory Duty: Code Of Practice) (Scotland) Order (SI 2002/3111)
- Education (Information About Individual Pupils) (England) (Amendment) Regulations (SI 2002/3112)
- Traffic Signs Regulations and General Directions 2002 (SI 2002/3113)
- The Homelessness Act 2002 (Commencement No. 3) (England) Order (SI 2002/3114)
- The Proceeds of Crime Act 2002 (Cash Searches: Code of Practice) Order (SI 2002/3115)
- The Income-related Benefits (Subsidy to Authorities) Amendment (No. 2) Order (SI 2002/3116)
- The Air Quality Limit Values (Amendment) Regulations (SI 2002/3117)
- The National Emission Ceilings Regulations (SI 2002/3118)
- The Tax Credits (Notice of Appeal) Regulations (SI 2002/3119)
- The Social Security Contributions (Decisions and Appeals) (Amendment) Regulations (SI 2002/3120)
- The Service Departments Registers (Amendment) Order (SI 2002/3122)
- The Public Lending Right Scheme 1982 (Commencement of Variations) Order (SI 2002/3123)
- The National Lottery (Licence Fees) (Amendment) Order (SI 2002/3124)
- The Private Security Industry Act 2001 (Commencement No. 1) Order (SI 2002/3125)
- The Northern Ireland Act 2000 (Prescribed Documents) Order (SI 2002/3126)
- The Mersey Docks and Harbour Company (Langton River Berth) Harbour Revision Order (SI 2002/3127)
- The Working Time (Amendment) Regulations (SI 2002/3128)
- The Electricity (Approval of Pattern or Construction and Installation and Certification) (Amendment) Regulations (SI 2002/3129)
- The Gas (Calculation of Thermal Energy) (Amendment) Regulations (SI 2002/3130)
- The Crown Office (Forms and Proclamations Rules) (Amendment) Order (SI 2002/3131)
- The Merchant Shipping (Confirmation of Legislation) (Bermuda) Order (SI 2002/3132)
- The Proceeds of Crime Act 2002 (Enforcement in different parts of the United Kingdom) Order (SI 2002/3133)
- The General Dental Council (Constitution) Amendment Order (SI 2002/3134)
- The Medical Act 1983 (Amendment) Order (SI 2002/3135)
- The General Medical Council (Constitution) Order (SI 2002/3136)
- The Double Taxation Relief (Taxes on Income)(Taiwan) Order (SI 2002/3137)
- The Double Taxation Relief (Taxes on Income)(South Africa) Order (SI 2002/3138)
- The European Communities (Definition of Treaties) (Agreement on Trade, Development and Co-operation between the European Community and its Member States and the Republic of South Africa) Order (SI 2002/3139)
- The Proceeds of Crime Act 2002 (Commencement No. 3) Order (SI 2002/3145)
- Welsh Administration Ombudsman (Jurisdiction) Order (SI 2002/3146)
- The Merchant Shipping (Revocation) (Bermuda) Order (SI 2002/3147)
- The Trade Marks Act 1994 (Isle of Man) (Amendment) Order (SI 2002/3148)
- The Local Government (Miscellaneous Provisions) (Northern Ireland) Order (SI 2002/3149)
- The Company Directors Disqualification (Northern Ireland) Order (SI 2002/3150)
- The Fur Farming (Prohibition) (Northern Ireland) Order (SI 2002/3151)
- The Insolvency (Northern Ireland) Order (SI 2002/3152)
- The Environment (Northern Ireland) Order (SI 2002/3153)
- The Housing Support Services (Northern Ireland) Order (SI 2002/3154)
- The Harbours (Northern Ireland) Order (SI 2002/3155)
- The Education (Inspectors of Schools in England) (No. 2) Order (SI 2002/3156)
- The Kava-kava in Food (Wales) Regulations (SI 2002/3157)
- The Individual Savings Account (Amendment No. 3) Regulations (SI 2002/3158)
- The Organic Products (Wales) Regulations (SI 2002/3159)
- The Smoke Control Areas (Authorised Fuels) (Amendment) (Wales) Regulations (SI 2002/3160)
- The Inspection of Boarding Schools and Colleges (Powers and Fees)(Wales) Regulations (SI 2002/3161)
- The Police (Amendment) (No. 3) Regulations (SI 2002/3162)
- The Kava-kava in Food (England) Regulations (SI 2002/3169)
- The Medicines for Human Use (Kava-kava) (Prohibition) Order (SI 2002/3170)
- The Beet Seed (England) Regulations (SI 2002/3171)
- The Fodder Plant Seed (England) Regulations (SI 2002/3172)
- The Cereal Seed (England) Regulations (SI 2002/3173)
- The Oil and Fibre Plant Seed (England) Regulations (SI 2002/3174)
- The Vegetable Seed (England) Regulations (SI 2002/3175)
- The Seed (Registration, Licensing and Enforcement) (England) Regulations (SI 2002/3176)
- The School Companies (Private Finance Initiative Companies) Regulations (SI 2002/3177)
- The Education (Pupil Exclusions and Appeals) (Maintained Schools) (England) Regulations (SI 2002/3178)
- The Education (Pupil Exclusions and Appeals) (Pupil Referral Units) (England) Regulations (SI 2002/3179)
- The Special Constables (Amendment) Regulations (SI 2002/3180)
- The Street Works (Inspection Fees) (Amendment) (Wales) Regulations (SI 2002/3181)
- The Air Quality (Amendment) (Wales) Regulations (SI 2002/3182)
- The Air Quality Limit Values (Wales) Regulations (SI 2002/3183)
- The Education Act 2002 (Transitional Provisions) (Wales) Regulations (SI 2002/3184)
- The Education Act 2002 (Commencement No. 1) (Wales) Order (SI 2002/3185)
- The Rating Lists (Valuation Date) (Wales) Order (SI 2002/3186)
- The Leasehold Reform (Notices) (Amendment) (Wales) Regulations (SI 2002/3187)
- The Genetically Modified Organisms (Deliberate Release) (Wales) Regulations (SI 2002/3188)
- The National Health Service (Pharmaceutical Services) and (General Medical Services) (Amendment) (Wales) Regulations (SI 2002/3189)
- The National Health Service Reform and Health Care Professions Act 2002 (Commencement No. 3) Order (SI 2002/3190)
- The Tax Credits (Appeals) (No. 2) Regulations (SI 2002/3196)
- The State Pension Credit (Consequential, Transitional and Miscellaneous Provisions) (No. 2) Regulations (SI 2002/3197)
- The Plant Varieties and Seeds Tribunal (Amendment) (England and Wales) Rules (SI 2002/3198)
- The LEA Budget, Schools Budget and Individual Schools Budget (England) Regulations (SI 2002/3199)
- The Education (Student Support) (No. 2) Regulations (SI 2002/3200)

== 3201–3300 ==
- The Preston (Parishes) Order (SI 2002/3201)
- The Police Pensions (Pension Sharing) Regulations (SI 2002/3202)
- The Regulatory Reform (Removal of 20 Member Limit in Partnerships etc.) Order (SI 2002/3203)
- The Supply of Beer (Tied Estate) (Revocation) Order (SI 2002/3204)
- The Regulatory Reform (Special Occasions Licensing) Order (SI 2002/3205)
- The Products of Animal Origin (Third Country Imports) (England) (Amendment) (No 4) Regulations (SI 2002/3206)
- The Flexible Working (Procedural Requirements) Regulations (SI 2002/3207)
- The Leasehold Reform (Collective Enfranchisement) (Counter-notices) (England) Regulations (SI 2002/3208)
- The Leasehold Reform (Notices) (Amendment) (No. 2) (England) Regulations (SI 2002/3209)
- The Care Standards Act 2000 (Commencement and Transitional Provisions) (Amendment No. 2) (England) Order (SI 2002/3210)
- The National Care Standards Commission (Fees and Frequency of Inspections) Amendment (No. 3) Regulations (SI 2002/3211)
- Nurses Agencies Regulations (SI 2002/3212)
- The Residential Family Centres Regulations (SI 2002/3213)
- The Domiciliary Care Agencies Regulations (SI 2002/3214)
- The Protection of Animals (Anaesthetics) Amendment Order (SI 2002/3215)
- The Street Works (Records) (England) Regulations (SI 2002/3217)
- The District of South Norfolk (Electoral Changes)Order (SI 2002/3218)
- The Civil Procedure (Amendment No. 2) Rules (SI 2002/3219)
- The Children and Family Court Advisory and Support Service (Miscellaneous Amendments) Order (SI 2002/3220)
- The District of Breckland (Electoral Changes) Order (SI 2002/3221)
- The City of Norwich (Electoral Changes) Order (SI 2002/3222)
- The Borough of Blackburn with Darwen (Electoral Changes) Order (SI 2002/3223)
- The District of Malvern Hills (Electoral Changes)Order (SI 2002/3224)
- The City of Worcester (Electoral Changes) Order (SI 2002/3225)
- The Potatoes Originating in Egypt (Amendment) (Wales) (No. 2) Regulations (SI 2002/3226)
- The Borough of King's Lynn and West Norfolk (Electoral Changes) Order (SI 2002/3227)
- The Borough of Great Yarmouth (Electoral Changes) Order (SI 2002/3228)
- The Movement of Animals (Restrictions) (England) Order (SI 2002/3229)
- The Products of Animal Origin (Third Country Imports) (Wales) (Amendment) (No.2) Regulations (SI 2002/3230)
- The Animal By–Products (Identification) (Amendment) (England) (No. 2) Regulations (SI 2002/3231)
- The Electricity (Connection Charges) (Amendment) Regulations (SI 2002/3232)
- The Access to Justice Act 1999 (Solicitors' Practising Certificates) Order (SI 2002/3235)
- The Flexible Working (Eligibility, Complaints and Remedies) Regulations (SI 2002/3236)
- The Social Security Commissioners (Procedure) (Tax Credits Appeals) Regulations (SI 2002/3237)
- The Gloucestershire County Council (Two Mile Bend Bridge) Scheme 2001 Confirmation Instrument (SI 2002/3238)
- The Gloucestershire County Council (Castle Meads Bridge) Scheme 2001 Confirmation Instrument (SI 2002/3239)
- The Allocation of Housing (England) Regulations (SI 2002/3264)
- The Road Traffic (Permitted Parking Area and Special Parking Area) (County of Worcestershire) (City of Worcester) Order (SI 2002/3265)
- The Road Traffic (Permitted Parking Area and Special Parking Area) (City of Sunderland) Order (SI 2002/3266)
- The New Roads and Street Works Act 1991 (Commencement No. 7) (England) Order (SI 2002/3267)
- The Gloucester Harbour Revision (Constitution) Order (SI 2002/3268)
- The Port of Ipswich (Transfer of Undertaking) Harbour Revision Order (SI 2002/3269)
- The Carmarthenshire and Pembrokeshire (Clynderwen, Cilymaenllwyd and Henllanfallteg) Order (SI 2002/3270)
- The Newport (Caerleon and Malpas) Order (SI 2002/3271)
- The Ceredigion and Pembrokeshire (St Dogmaels) Order (SI 2002/3272)
- The Cardiff and Vale of Glamorgan (Michaelston and Grangetown) Order (SI 2002/3273)
- The County of Gwynedd (Electoral Changes) Order (SI 2002/3274)
- The County of Monmouthshire (Electoral Changes) Order (SI 2002/3275)
- The County Borough of Newport (Electoral Changes) Order (SI 2002/3276)
- The County Borough of The Vale of Glamorgan (Electoral Changes) Order (SI 2002/3277)
- The County of Ceredigion (Electoral Changes) Order (SI 2002/3278)
- The County Borough of Torfaen (Electoral Changes) Order (SI 2002/3279)

== See also ==
- List of statutory instruments of the United Kingdom
