= Health and safety regulations in the United Kingdom =

In the United Kingdom there are several pieces of regulation relevant to health and safety at work. Prior to Brexit, many of these gave effect to European Union directives.

== Regulations made under the Health and Safety at Work etc. Act 1974 ==
Health and safety legislation in the UK is drawn up and enforced by the Health and Safety Executive and local authorities under the Health and Safety at Work etc. Act 1974 (HASAWA or HSWA). HASAWA introduced (section 2) a general duty on an employer to ensure, so far as is reasonably practicable, the health, safety and welfare at work of all his employees, with the intention of giving a legal framework supporting codes of practice not in themselves having legal force but establishing a strong presumption as to what was reasonably practicable (deviations from them could be justified by appropriate risk assessment). The previous reliance on detailed prescriptive rule-setting was seen as having failed to respond rapidly enough to technological change, leaving new technologies potentially unregulated or inappropriately regulated.

Breach of the health and safety regulations is a crime throughout the UK. In England and Wales contravention is punishable on summary conviction or on indictment with an unlimited fine. Both individuals and corporations can be punished, and sentencing practice is published by the Sentencing Guidelines Council.

In England and Wales, a person who suffered damage caused by a breach of the regulations used to have a cause of action in tort against the offender. However, section 69 of the Enterprise and Regulatory Reform Act 2013 repealed this right of action. This prevents a claimant from claiming damages against an employer for contravention of an absolute duty. Instead, they must now prove that the employer was negligent as with other torts. A similar right of action exists in Scotland through the law of delict.

=== The "six pack" regulations ===
- Health and Safety (Display Screen Equipment) Regulations 1992
- Manual Handling Operations Regulations 1992
- Personal Protective Equipment at Work Regulations 1992
- Workplace (Health, Safety and Welfare) Regulations 1992
- Provision and Use of Work Equipment Regulations 1998 (PUWER)
- Management of Health and Safety at Work Regulations 1999

=== Worker consultation ===
- Safety Representatives and Safety Committees Regulations 1977
- Health and Safety (Consultation with Employees) Regulations 1996
- Offshore Installations (Safety Representatives and Safety Committees) Regulations 1989

The first two regulations above (as amended) are supported by Approved Codes of Practice and guidance issued by the Health and Safety Executive (HSE).

=== Other ===
- Dangerous Substances in Harbour Areas Regulations 1987 (SI 1987/37)
- Electricity at Work Regulations 1989 (SI 1989/635)
- Borehole Sites and Operations Regulations 1995 (SI 1995/2038)
- Confined Spaces Regulations 1997 (SI 1997/1713)
- Lifting Operations and Lifting Equipment Regulations 1998 (SI 1998/2307) (LOLER)
- Transport of Dangerous Goods (Safety Advisers) Regulations 1999 (SI 1999/257)
- Ionising Radiations Regulations 1999 (SI 1999/3232)
- Pressure Equipment Regulations 1999 (SI 1999/2001)
- Pressure Systems Safety Regulations 2000 (SI 2000/128) (PSSR), replacing the earlier Pressure Systems and Transportable Gas Containers Regulations 1989, came into force on 21 February 2000
- Dangerous Substances and Explosive Atmospheres Regulations 2002 (SI 2002/2776) (DSEAR)
- Chemicals (Hazard Information and Packaging for Supply) Regulations 2002 (SI 2002/1689) (CHIP), giving effect to EU Directive 67/548/EEC
- Control of Lead at Work Regulations 2002 (SI 2002/2676)
- Control of Substances Hazardous to Health Regulations 2002 (SI 2002/2677) (COSHH)
- Work at Height Regulations 2005 (SI 2005/735)
- Control of Noise at Work Regulations 2005 (SI 2005/1643)
- Control of Vibration at Work Regulations 2005 (SI 2005/1093)
- Control of Asbestos Regulations 2012 (SI 2012/632)
- Reporting of Injuries, Diseases and Dangerous Occurrences Regulations 2013 (RIDDOR)
- Acetylene Safety (England and Wales and Scotland) Regulations 2014 (SI 2014/1639)
- Construction (Design and Management) Regulations 2015 (SI 2015/51)
- Control of Major Accident Hazards Regulations 2015 (SI 2015/483) (COMAH)
- Ionising Radiation (Medical Exposure) Regulations 2017 (SI 2017/1322)
- Radiation (Emergency Preparedness and Public Information) Regulations 2019 (SI 2019/703)
- Health and Safety (Safety Signs and Signals) Regulations 1996

A full list of all UK health and safety legislation can be found on the HSE website.

== Statutory inspection ==
A number of statutes require a "thorough inspection" to take place at prescribed intervals. The HSE describes a thorough inspection as "a systematic and detailed examination of the equipment and safety-critical parts, carried out at specified intervals by a competent person who must then complete a written report". The main statutory inspection regulations are:

Category	Legislation	Frequency of thorough inspection	Notes
Lifting and handling plant including passenger lifts	Lifting Operations and Lifting Equipment Regulations 1998 (LOLER) regulation 9	6 monthly for equipment which lifts persons, otherwise 12 monthly	
Power presses, guards and protection devices, other dangerous machinery	Provision and Use of Work Equipment Regulations 1998 (PUWER), especially Regulations 32–35	On installation and relocation, thereafter 12 monthly where there are fixed guards, otherwise 6 monthly.	In addition, PUWER makes employers responsible for ensuring that any work equipment exposed to conditions causing deterioration which is liable to cause dangerous conditions is inspected at suitable intervals
Pressure systems	Pressure Systems Safety Regulations 2000 (PSSR)	In accordance with a written scheme of examination	The HSE is authorised to provide an exemption in appropriate circumstances. A pressure system which forms an enclosure for high voltage equipment is exempt, effective 1 December 2021.
Local exhaust ventilation (LEVs) and extraction plant	Control of Substances Hazardous to Health Regulations 2002 (COSHH)	Every 14 months	
Protective equipment for working at heights	Work at Heights Regulations 2005 regulation 12	At suitable intervals	Such visual or more rigorous inspection by a competent person as is appropriate for safety purposes, including appropriate testing

== REACH ==
The registration, evaluation, authorisation and restriction of chemicals in the UK reflects the EU REACH regulation (EC 1907/2006).

Having entered into force in 2007, REACH provisions were phased in over a period of 11 years.
