= Tagging system =

System of recording and displaying the status of a machine or equipment

In occupational health and safety, a tagging system is a system of recording and displaying the status of a machine or equipment, enabling staff to view whether it is in working order. It is a product of industry-specific legislation which sets safety standards for a particular piece of equipment, involving inspection, record-keeping, and repair. This sets standardized umbrella terms for equipment and machinery (e.g. machinery, scaffolding, forklift, cherry picker) to be deemed 'safe to use'.

== Characteristics ==
A tagging system consists of a holder and insert, and is specifically designed for certain industries, machinery and equipment. For instance, a scaffold tagging system is designed to be used at the entrances and exits of erect scaffolding. A ladder tag system is designed to be permanently fixed onto the inside edge of all ladders that are used within the workplace or site.

The majority of tagging system holders are manufactured to withstand extreme weather conditions and remain attached to its equipment. Inserts are produced from polypropylene (PP) which is heat resistant and durable under adverse weather conditions.

All tagging system holders should come with an inspection warning print on the inside of the holder with space to write a reference number (ref no.), which is based on the company's system. The empty holder should have text notifying the user that the inspection record is missing and needs to be replaced (in essence, that the equipment needs to be inspected again before being deemed 'safe to use'). This notice is hidden when an insert is placed into the holder.

Tagging system inserts commonly include: a ref no.; inspection dates (due and complete); inspector name, signature, and contact number; weight class; structure type; and advice and warnings that are specific to its intended industry. Inserts are often custom designed by the company and broadly are the same format and size but include branding and contact details.

== Use ==
Tagging systems are mainly used in manufacturing and construction industries, but any workplace that uses machinery, tools and equipment should ensure that all these items are in full working order and that they have been inspected and will continue to be inspected for the safety of the user.

Tagging system types and their uses include:

- Scaffold – for scaffolding structures
- Tower – for scaffold towers and platforms
- Racking – for storage frameworks, such as in a warehouse
- Chemical – for chemical labelling
- Ladder – for ladders
- LOLER – for equipment that lifts or lowers
  - MEWP – for mobile elevating work platforms such as cherry pickers and scissor lifts
  - Forklift – for forklifts
- Universal equipment – for tools and equipment that need regular inspection but do not fit in any other category
- Isolation – for warning regarding an isolated power source
- Flange – for warning regarding the current state of a flange
- Mini-tags – used to highlight inspection due dates, portable appliance testing (PAT), vibration control, harness inspections and safe working load

== Legislation ==
=== United Kingdom ===
There is currently no legislation in the UK requiring use of a tagging system at a work site or workplace, though it is a legal obligation to inspect all machinery and tools and keep a valid record of said inspections. Equipment should be deemed 'safe to use' before use.

Major workplace hazards and legislation required to be met include:

- Working at height – Falling from a height accounts for nearly half of fatal workplace injuries, the majority of these occurring in construction. Common hazards include falls from ladders, scaffolding, or though a weak roof; objects falling from scaffolding; shock from contact with power lines followed by a fall; and collapse of scaffolding or racking. If a scaffolding or tower scaffolding platform has a drop of 2 metres (6 ft 7 in) or greater, then inspections are mandatory. All equipment and scaffolding should be regularly inspected, including after any changes have been made or after it has experienced severe weather conditions. Regulation requires the work to be "properly planned, supervised and carried out by competent people" and that the correct equipment is used for the job.
  - MEWP – Mobile elevating work platforms are covered by the Working at Height Regulation, which recommends a work restraint system. This would include a full body harness tethered to the MEWP basket.
- Forklifts – Lifting Operations and Lifting Equipment Regulations 1998 (LOLER) states "that all equipment used for lifting is fit for purpose, appropriate for the task, suitably marked and, in many cases, subject to statutory periodic 'thorough examination. Records must be kept of all thorough examinations and any defects found must be reported to both the person responsible for the equipment and the relevant enforcing authority.'"
- Working with Chemicals – The Control of Substances Hazardous to Health Regulations 2002 (COSHH) requires that harmful substances are labelled, accompanied by a data sheet, and that there is correctly placed safety signage. It further requires that personal protective equipment (PPE) is sufficiently strong and durable.
- Confined Space – Safety within confined spaces is covered by the Approved Code of Practice (ACOP) and The Confined Space Regulations 1997. These describe potential health hazards from substances or conditions, such as fumes or combustion.
- Electrical – Electrical hazards fall under the Health and Safety at Work etc. Act 1974 (HASWA), which requires hazard warning signs and up-to-date PAT testing. Employers should also provide posters and leaflets with information about electric shock hazards.
- Slips and falls – HASWA also states that employers should ensure that preventative action is taken to prevent slips, trips and falls.
- Machinery and tools – Equipment within the workplace is under the Provision and Use of Work Equipment Regulations 1998 (PUWER, 1999 in Northern Ireland) requiring that employers make all machinery safe for use, including adding precautions such as safety barriers PPE (also covered by Personal Protective Equipment at Work Regulations 1992). Machinery should be inspected at regular intervals to ensure it is in a continued 'safe to use' state.

The advice given above is often characterized as 'best practice' and may not always be legally binding.

== See also ==
- Construction site safety
