= Safety net =

Type of net

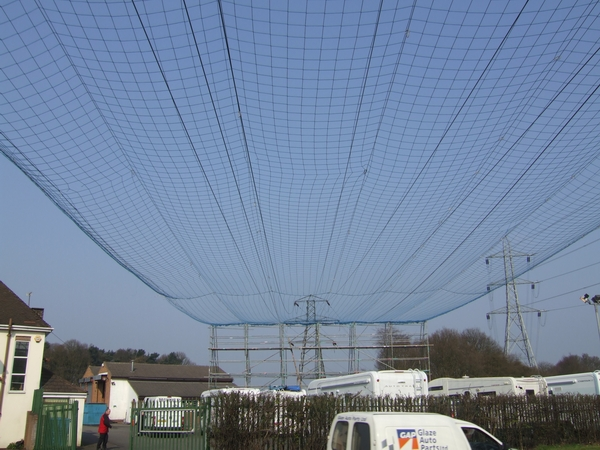
A safety net over a roadway to protect cars during an overhead cable replacement

A safety net is a type of net designed to protect people from injury after falling from heights by limiting the distance they fall, and dissipating the impact energy. The term also refers to devices for arresting falling or flying objects for the safety of people beyond or below the net.

Safety nets are used in construction, building maintenance, entertainment, and other industries.

== Action of a safety net ==
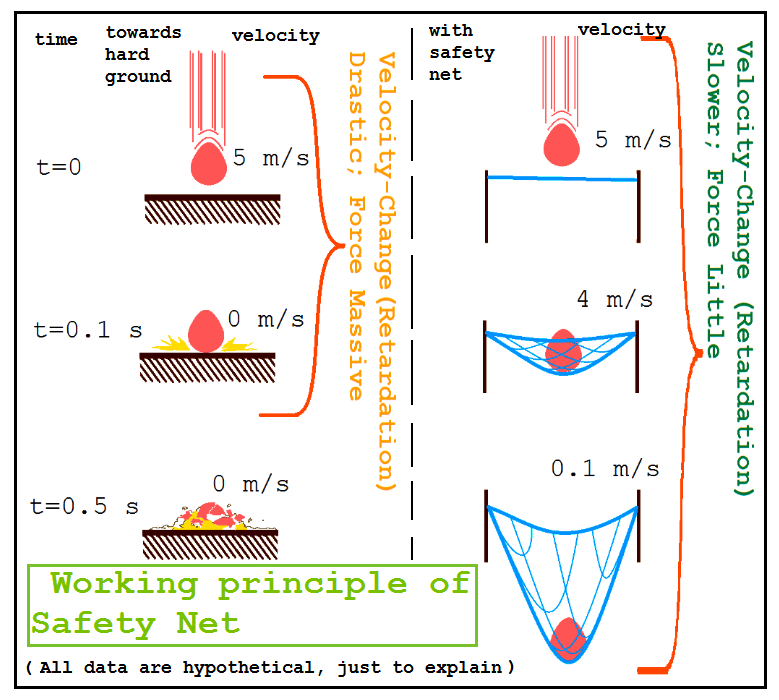
The safety net gives the falling object much more time to decelerate and come to zero velocity.

A safety net gives falling objects much more time to come to rest than hitting the hard ground directly. In physical terms, this means more time for deceleration and kinetic energy transfer, resulting in a softer landing and a much lower risk of damage.

The specific type of net to be used depends upon many factors, such as the falling object's speed and mass. To withstand more force, a greater total width of the net is required. The minimum distance between the spot on the net where the object impacted and the nearest edge of the net is also important and must be maintained above a certain limit. The materials used to make the net, and the tension of the net's ropes, are other important factors. Additionally, the net must be placed at an appropriate height from the hard ground, so that a falling object could not make contact with the ground. The hole size of the net should not be so big that falling objects could pass through its holes.

== Construction safety net ==
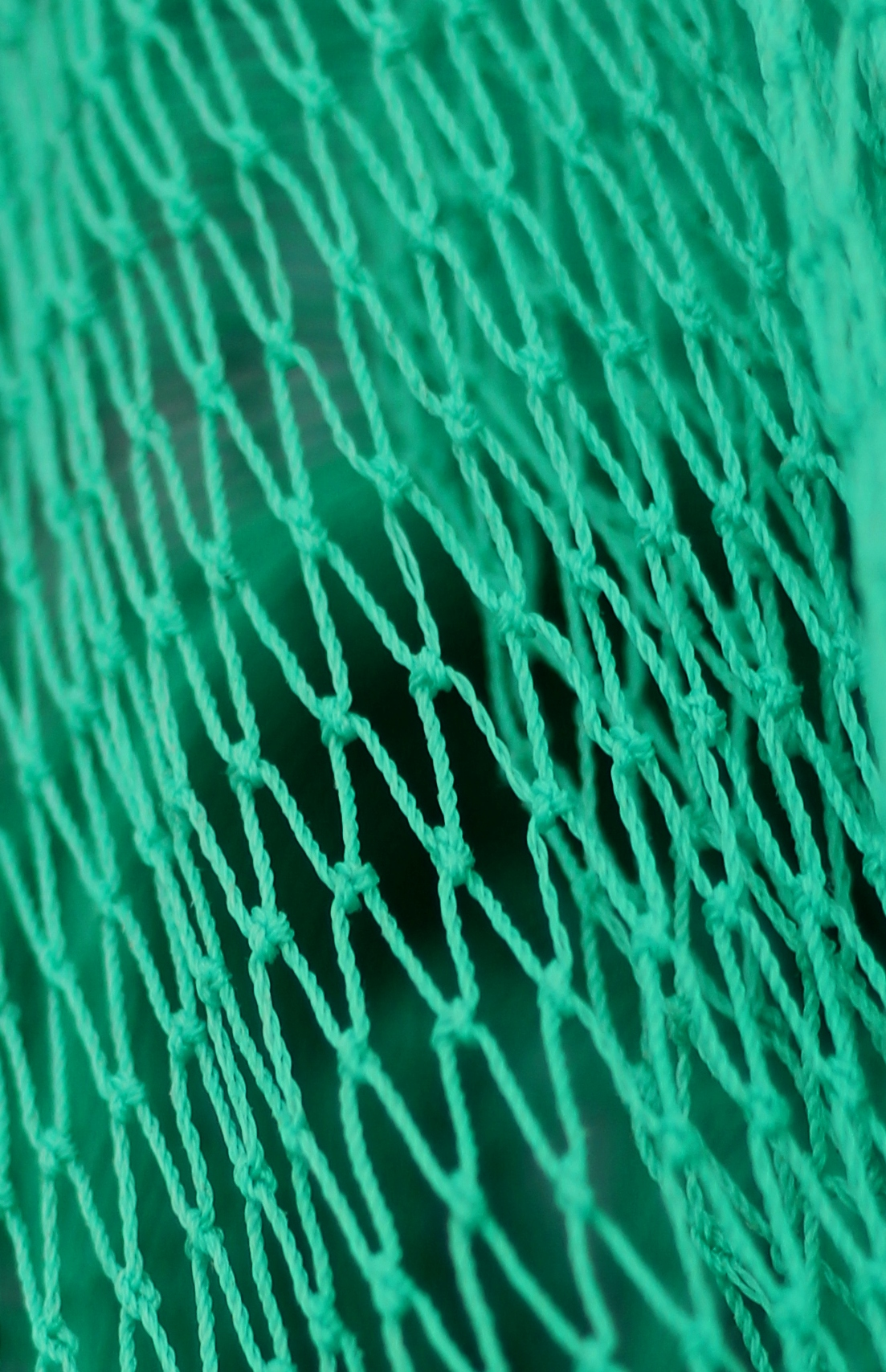
HDPE Monofilament Construction safety net. Mesh size is 85mm.

Construction safety nets are used on high-rise building construction sites to prevent the fall of people or objects from the site. Construction safety nets are the safest and most cost-effective fall prevention system in such an environment. Construction safety nets are typically made from high-density polyethylene (or HDPE) fibers. The construction safety netting system, also known as debris netting, can be installed both horizontally and vertically according to the site requirements. The best practice of construction safety netting is to wrap up the whole construction site from bottom to top, which works as a protection wall to prevent anything from falling without blocking the view of workers on the site. Installation of a safety net at any building site requires professional expertise and technical knowledge.

== Other uses of safety nets ==
Safety nets can also be used for escape from a building during a disaster (especially fires), action-sports and entertainment, etc.

== See also ==
- Construction site safety
- Fall arrest harness
- Roof edge protection
- Shock absorber
- Buffer (disambiguation)
- Buffer stop
- Buffer (rail transport)
- Damping ratio
- Damper (disambiguation)
- Damped wave
- Cushioning
- Shock (mechanics)
- Impact (mechanics)
- Jerk (physics)
- Impulse (physics)
- Collision
- Brake
- Terminal velocity
