= Bin tipper =

Machine lifting and inverting bins or carts

A bin tipper, also known as a bin-tipper, bin lifter, or cart dumper, is a machine which mechanically lifts and inverts bins/carts for the purpose of emptying them. Bin tippers are a type of lifting equipment used in many industries, including waste management, food processing, chemical manufacturing and facility management.

Although bin tippers are often components of larger machines (such as garbage trucks), an increasing number of 'standalone' or mobile units are available. Most bin tippers use mains electricity to power the lifting system, but some are powered by batteries, solar, crank-handle, or compressed air.

== Operational principal ==
Bin tippers typically have a steel frame, guarding and cradle, with a motor or crank-handle driving a lifting mechanism, which may be hydraulic or chain operated. Bins are placed into the machine, then lifted and inverted over the destination receptacle, allowing the contents to be emptied by gravity.

Most bin tippers are designed to comply with one of three standards:

- EN 840-compliant bin tippers use a comb-lift mechanism, latching onto reinforced combing around the lip of the bin. This standard is commonly used in the waste-management industry in Europe, Asia and Australasia. Compliant bins are often called wheelie bins or MGBs.
- ANSI Z245.60 (Type B)-compliant bin tippers use a front-lift mechanism, latching onto a moulded indentation in the front of the bin. This standard is commonly used in the waste-management industry in North America. Compliant bins are often called toters, waste carts or trash cans.
- DIN 9797-compliant bin tippers use a trunnion-lift mechanism, latching onto two trunnions projecting from the sides of the bin. This standard is commonly used in the food-processing industry. Compliant bins are often called euro bins, tote bins, or meat carts.
- Bin tippers may also use various non-standard means to secure the bin, including hydraulic pincers, or base-lift cradles with wheel latches or chain fastenings.

== History ==
A side-load bin tipper was fitted to a garbage truck as early as 1929, by the Heil company in America. In the 1950s the Dempster Dumpmaster popularized the front-end loader variant, with bins being tipped over the cab of the truck. Both types of integrated bin tipper are now common on municipal refuse collection trucks.

Standalone bin tippers are now common on large commercial facilities, events venues and campuses, since it allows smaller mobile bins to be dispersed for waste collection, then emptied into a skip bin or dumpster; which in turn can be emptied by a front-load garbage truck.

The use of bin tippers and other lifting aids has been stimulated in recent years by research linking heavy manual lifting with musculoskeletal disorders; some government organisations, schools and companies now prohibit emptying bins by hand. Health and safety concerns have also driven the adoption of bin tippers in the manufacturing, food-processing and construction industries.
