= Guard rail (disambiguation) =

A guard rail is a protective boundary feature.

Guard rail or guardrail may also refer to:

- Railroad guard rails (otherwise known as check rails), installed parallel to trackbed rails, for railway safety
- RC-12 Guardrail, a U.S. Army intelligence-gathering aircraft based on the C-12 Huron
- Roof edge protection, rails installed on roofs to protect construction and roofing workers
- Traffic barrier, installed on roadways for automobile safety
