= Triax Technologies =

Connecticut-based technology company

- Industry: Industrial internet of things (IIoT)
- Founded: 2012
- Headquarters: Toronto, Ontario, Canada
- Parent: Invixium
- Website: www.triaxtec.com

Triax Technologies, Inc., is a Canadian technology company that develops and delivers IoT technology for the Construction industry. The company was founded in 2012 and is headquartered in Toronto, Ontario.

== Spot-r by Triax ==
Triax's flagship Spot-r system connects workers, equipment and managers through an infrastructure network, sensors, and a cloud-based dashboard.

Spot-r's wearable device, known as the Spot-r Clip, is worn by workers and connects to the Spot-r network on site to provide real-time worker location and activity data. The Clip records and transmits slip, trip and fall events to designated supervisors via text message, dashboard or email notifications. A push-button on the wearable device allows workers to report unsafe conditions, site hazards or other potential injuries in real-time without leaving their work area. Supervisors can also trigger a site wide evacuation alert to each worker's device in case of emergency.

The dashboard provides aggregate on-going and historical data on worker time and attendance, location, certification, subcontractor activity, and safety incidents.

In October 2017, Spot-r was awarded a Business Insurance 2017 Innovation Award for innovative risk management products and services.

=== Spot-r EquipTag ===
In November 2017, Triax announced the Spot-r EquipTag, which tracks operator identity, equipment location, and equipment utilization without the limitations of traditional telematics solutions such as equipment size or indoor/outdoor location. The sensor uses the Spot-r network to track location and utilization and layers in Spot-r Clip workforce and certification data to identify how equipment is being operated and by whom at the job site.

=== Partnerships ===
In October 2017, Triax announced that Lettire Construction Corporation is the first New York City contractor to implement Spot-r at its job site.

=== Acquisition by Invixium ===
In July 2024, Triax Technologies was acquired by Invixium, a provider of biometric access control and workforce management solutions.

== Triax Smart Impact Monitor ==
Triax previously manufactured and sold two sports products, the SIM-P for individual athletes and the SIM-G for teams and organizations, designed and developed to measure the force and frequency of head impacts in real-time. The Smart Impact Monitor (SIM) embedded a small sensor in either a headband or skullcap to measure hits to head during sporting practice and activity. The sensors contain a 3-axis high-g linear accelerometer that measures 3 to 400 G's, and a 3-axis gyroscope to capture rotational acceleration.

In October 2014, Triax announced a partnership with retired American soccer player, Abby Wambach, to launch the SIM-P to support long-term player health and safety. Abby suffered a concussion on April 20, 2013, while playing for the Western New York Flash of the NWSL.

== See also ==
- Construction site safety
- Internet of Things
- Wearable technology
