= John Fox (statistician) =

British statistician

Anthony John Fox (born 25 April 1946) is a British statistician, who has worked in both the public service and academia.

He was born on 25 April 1946, the son of Fred Frank Fox OBE. He was educated at Dauntsey's School, University College London (BSc) and Imperial College London (PhD). He was a statistician at the Employment Medical Advisory Service, 1970-5 and then the Medical Statistics Division of the Office of Population Censuses and Surveys (OPCS) until 1979. In the latter job, he helped to set up the England and Wales Longitudinal Survey, which monitors the health, address changes and fertility of a 1% sample of the population of England and Wales over time for statistical purposes.

During 1980–8, he was Professor of Social Statistics at City University, building up his department into one of the world's leading centres for social statistics. He returned to OPCS in 1988 as the United Kingdom Chief Medical Statistician. In 1990, he took on the additional post of honorary professor at the London School of Hygiene and Tropical Medicine.

In 1996, following the creation of the Office for National Statistics (ONS) (into which OPCS was incorporated), cuts in the senior Civil Service meant that his responsibilities were widened to include demographic statistics and he became Director of the Census, Population and Health Group there. In 1999, he moved to the Department of Health as Director of Statistics. Due to further cuts in senior statistical posts in the Civil Service, he soon became the most senior government statistician outside the ONS.

In 2004, he became the "Change Manager" responsible for setting up the new English Information Centre for Health and Social Care (since renamed the Health and Social Care Information Centre), which officially came into existence on 1 April 2005. This centre was an NHS special health authority, so he and his staff were part of the NHS. He was the Director of Customer and Stakeholder Engagement. The permanent Chief Executive from July 2005 is Professor Denise Lievesley, formerly director of Statistics at UNESCO.

John has published several books on mortality and health statistics.
