= The Workplace Depot =

- Type: Private
- Industry: Retail; Wholesale
- Predecessor: Central Source Ltd.
- Founded: 1991; 35 years ago in Nottingham, England
- Founders: Central Source: Ken Miller; The Workplace Depot: Steve Miller
- Headquarters: Nottingham, Nottinghamshire, England
- Area served: United Kingdom
- Key people: Steve Miller (CEO)
- Products: Industrial and workplace equipment
- Website: theworkplacedepot.co.uk

The Workplace Depot is a British retailer of industrial and workplace equipment based in Nottingham.

== History ==
The Workplace Depot was founded in 1991 as Central Source Ltd by Ken Miller, initially operating from an industrial unit in Nottingham as a distributor of industrial products.

In 2012, under the leadership of Miller's son Steve Miller, The Workplace Depot was launched as an online retailer, which resulted in a shift away from the traditional catalogue-based distribution model. In 2021, the two entities were formally merged under The Workplace Depot brand.

The Workplace Depot was named The Sunday Times Top 10 Best Places to Work in both 2025 and 2026. In 2026, it was also ranked first by Great Place to Work's UK's Best Workplaces list.

In May 2026, The Workplace Depot received a King's Award for Enterprise.

== Operations ==
The Workplace Depot is headquartered at Miller House on Moorbridge Road East in Bingham and operates warehouses on the same industrial estate. Its product range includes materials handling and lifting equipment, storage and shelving, ladders, safety barriers, and health and safety supplies.

It also manufactures its own range of mobile safety steps and access platforms at a facility in the United Kingdom.
