= Shed roof =

Roof consisting of a single sloping surface

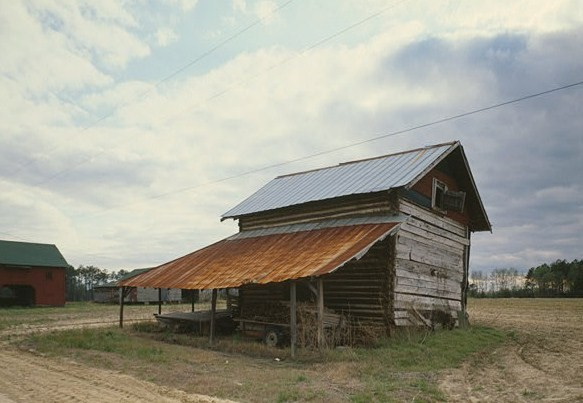
Shed roof attached to a barn

A shed roof, also known variously as a pent roof, lean-to roof, outshot, catslide, skillion roof (in Australia and New Zealand), and, rarely, a mono-pitched roof, is a single-pitched roof surface. This is in contrast to a dual- or multiple-pitched roof.

== Applications ==
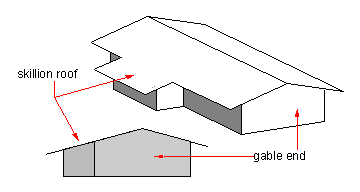
Single-pitched "outshot" or "catslide" addition to a structure with a gable roof

A single-pitched roof can be a smaller addition to an existing roof, known in some areas as a lean-to roof, and a "outshot", "catslide", or skillion roof in others.

Some Saltbox homes were expanded by the addition of such a roof, often at a shallower pitch than the original roof.

Single-pitched roofs are used beneath clerestory windows.

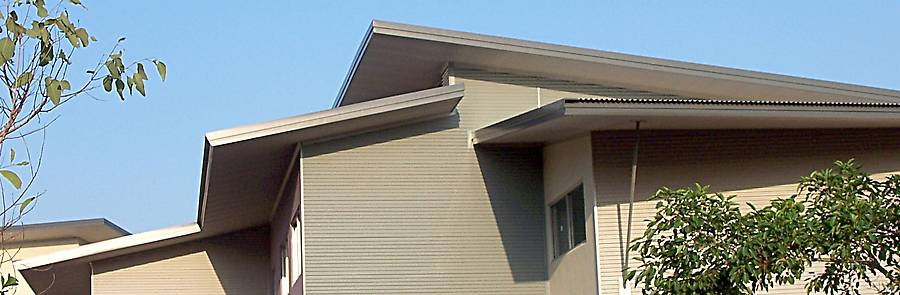
Modern single-pitched roofs in northern Australia

One or more single-pitched roofs can be used for aesthetic consideration(s).

A form of single-pitched roof with multiple roof surfaces is the sawtooth roof.

== See also ==
- Domestic roof construction
- List of roof shapes
- Roof edge protection
- Dutch gable roof
- Hammerbeam roof
