= Collision avoidance in transportation =

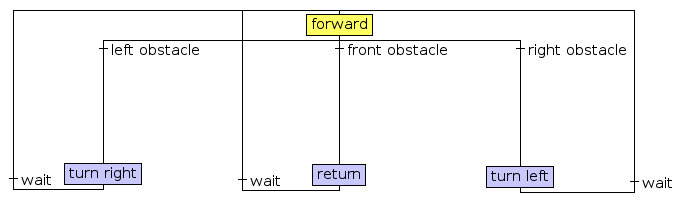
A simple collision avoidance system

In transportation, collision avoidance is the maintenance of systems and practices designed to prevent vehicles (such as aircraft, motor vehicles, ships, cranes and trains) from colliding with each other. They perceive the environment with sensors and prevent collisions using the data collected from the sensors. Collision avoidance is used in autonomous vehicles, aviation, trains and water transport. Examples of collision avoidance include:

- Airborne collision avoidance systems for aircraft
- Automatic Identification System for collision avoidance in water transport
- Collision avoidance (spacecraft)
- Collision avoidance system in automobiles
- Positive train control
- Tower Crane Anti-Collision Systems

Collision avoidance requires the position of objects in its surroundings and the location of the vehicle relative to their positions.

== Technology ==
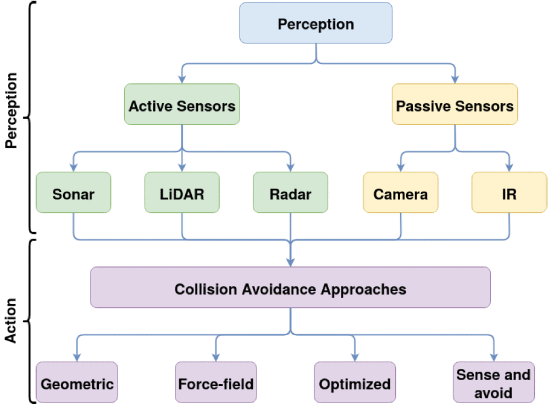
It shows the sensor types and their use in collision avoidance.

Many collision avoidance systems need two things:

- The position of all other vehicles
- The position of the vehicle relative to other vehicles

The first step in collision avoidance is perception, which can use sensors like LiDAR, visual cameras, thermal or IR cameras, or solid-state devices. They are divided upon the part of the electromagnetic spectrum they use. There are two types of sensors, passive and active sensors. Examples of active sensors are LiDAR, Radar and Sonar. Examples of passive sensors are cameras and thermal sensors.

=== Passive sensors ===
Passive sensors detect energy discharged by objects around them. They are primarily visual or infrared cameras. Visual cameras operate in visible light, and thermal cameras operate in infrared light (wavelength of 700 nanometres to 14 micrometres).

==== Visual Cameras ====
Cameras rely on capturing pictures of their surroundings to extract useful information. The advantages of using cameras are their smaller size, lesser weight and flexibility. Their disadvantages are their lack of image quality, and the sensitivity to the lighting and weather. They rely on image-processing systems to detect objects.

==== Infrared cameras ====
Infrared sensors use infrared light to detect objects. They are primarily used in low light conditions and can be used with visual cameras to overcome the poor performance of visual cameras in low lighting. They have a lower resolution than traditional cameras.

=== Active sensors ===
Active sensors emit radiation and read the reflected radiation. An active sensor has a transmitter and a receiver. A transmitter emits a signal like a light wave, an electrical signal, or an acoustic signal; this signal then bounces off an object, and the receiver of the sensor reads the reflected signal. They are fast, require less processing power and are affected less by weather.

==== Radar ====
A radio detection and ranging (radar) sensor transmits a radio signal which bounces back to the radar when it encounters an object. Depending on the time it took for the signal to bounce back, the distance between the object and the radar is calculated. Radar systems have good resistance to weather conditions.

==== Lidar ====
In a light detection and ranging (LiDAR) sensor, one part emits laser pulses onto the surface and the other reads the reflection to measure the time it took for each pulse to bounce back in order to calculate the distance. Since LiDAR uses a short wavelength, it can detect small objects. A LiDAR cannot detect transparent objects such as clear glass. Another sensor, such as an ultrasonic sensor, can be used to overcome this issue.

==== Sonar ====
Ultrasonic sensors measure the distance between an item and the sensor by sending out sound waves and then listening for the waves to be reflected back from the object. The frequency at which the sound waves are produced is higher than what is audible to humans. The distance can be derived using a formula:

$d = \frac{(v*t)}{2}$

where d is the distance, v is the speed of the wave, and t is the time of flight.

=== Autobrake ===
Warnings are given before the autobrake. If the driver ignores the warnings, the autonomous brake or autobrake will apply a partial or full brake. It can be active at any speed.

=== Blind spot monitoring ===
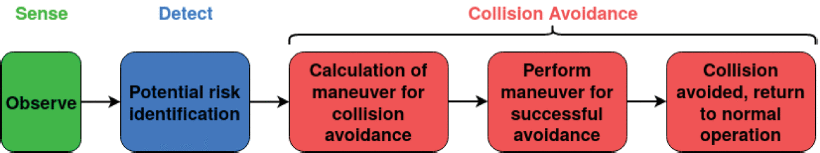
Steps used in collision avoidance.

A blind-spot monitoring system searches the spaces near the car with radars or cameras to detect any cars that may be approaching or hiding in blind zones. The relevant side-view mirror will display an illuminated symbol when a vehicle of that type is recognized.

=== Rear cross-traffic warning ===
Cross-traffic warning notifies the driver when traffic approaches from the sides when one reverses. The alert generally consists of a sound (like an auditory chirp) and a visual signal in either the outside mirror or the dash display for the back camera.

=== Pedestrian detection and braking ===
When one crosses into the path of an automobile, pedestrian detection can identify them. Certain vehicles will automatically apply the brakes, either fully or partially. Cyclists can also be detected by certain systems.

=== Adaptive headlights ===
Adaptive headlights will revolve when the driver spins the steering wheel illuminating the road around bends.

=== Lane departure warning (LDW) ===
Lane departure warning uses cameras and several sensors to detect lane markers and monitor the distance between the vehicle and these lanes. If the vehicle leaves the lane without signaling, a beep may be heard. It may also use physical systems such as vibration of the steering wheel or seat. In advanced versions, it may also apply brakes or turn the steering wheel to keep the vehicle within the lane.

== Classification ==
=== By methods used ===
There are four methods used for performing collision avoidance. They are:

- Geometric methods
- Force field methods
- Optimisation Based methods
- Sense and Avoid methods

==== Geometric methods ====
Geometric approaches analyse geometric attributes to make sure that a defined minimum distance between vehicles is not breached.

==== Force field methods ====
Force-field methods, also called potential field methods, use the concept of a repulsive or attractive force field to repel an agent from an obstacle or attract it to a target.

==== Optimisation based methods ====
Optimisation based methods calculate an trajectory that avoids collisions using geographical information.

==== Sense and avoid methods ====
Sense and avoid methods detect and avoid individual objects without attributes of other objects.

=== By activity ===
Depending on when they are deployed, collision avoidance systems can be classified into passive and active systems.

==== Passive types ====
Methods of collision avoidance like seatbelts and airbags are primarily designed to reduce injury to the driver. They are passive types of collision avoidance. This includes rescue systems that notify rescue centers of an accident.

==== Active types ====
With the addition of camera and radar sensing technologies, active types of collision avoidance can assist or warn the driver, or take control in dangerous situations.

== Uses ==
=== In aviation ===
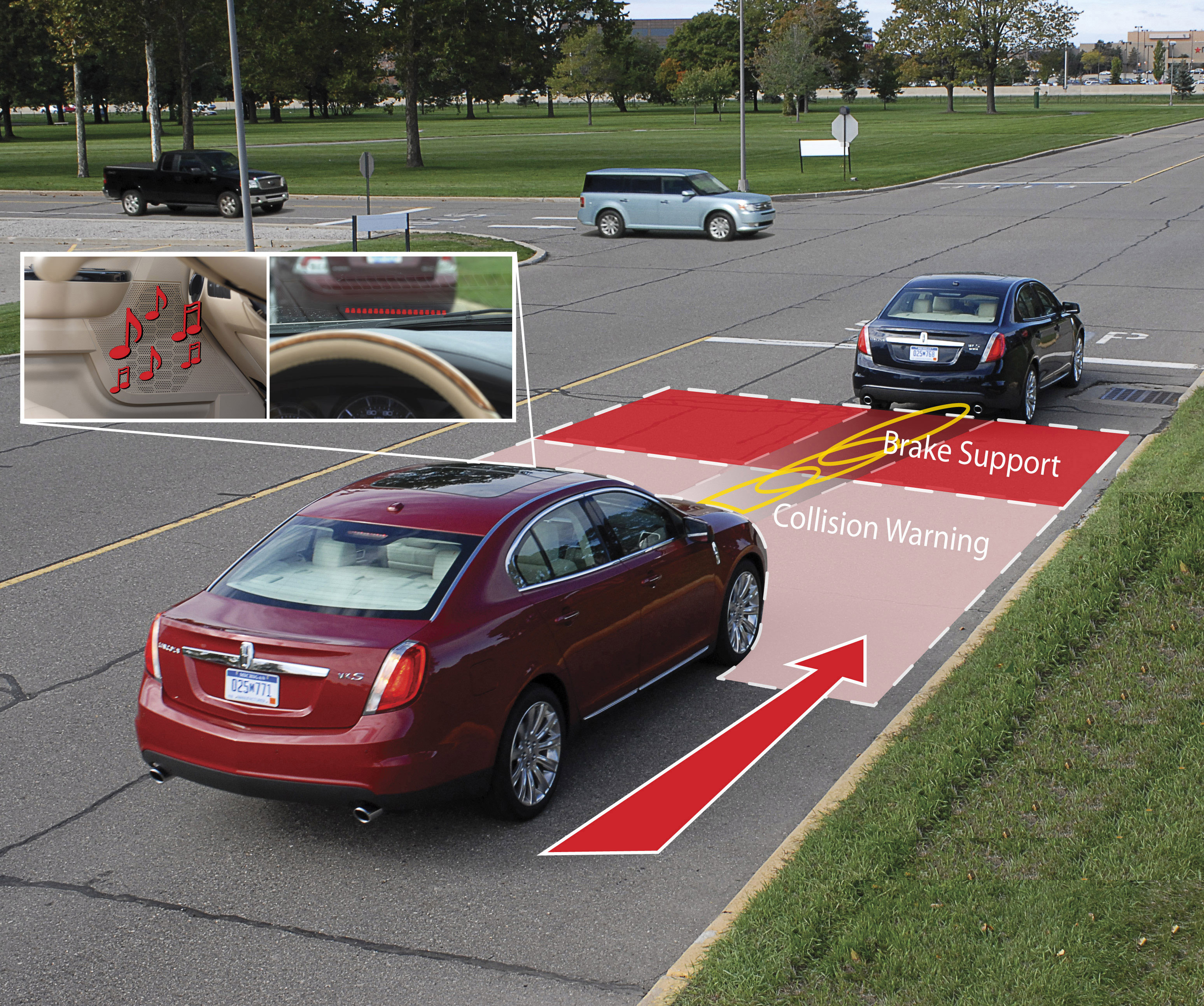
An example of a collision avoidance system.

Unmanned aerial vehicles can use collision avoidance systems to operate safely. TCAS is a collision avoidance system that is widely used. It is a universally accepted last resort meant to reduce the chance of collisions.

=== In autonomous driving ===
Collision avoidance is also used in autonomous cars. The aim of a collision avoidance system in vehicles is to prevent collisions, primarily caused by negligence or blind spots, by developing safety measures.

=== In trains ===
Automatic Train Protection, an important function of a train control system, helps prevent collisions by managing the speed of the train. Kavach is a collision avoidance system used in the Indian Railways.

=== In ships and other water transport ===
Automatic identification systems are used for collision avoidance in water transport.

=== In spacecraft and space stations ===
Collision avoidance has been routinely used in spacecraft or space stations (when possible) to ensure their safety. The International Space Station (ISS) has performed 14 maneuvers between 2008 and 2014 due to the threat of a collision.

== See also ==
- Contention (telecommunications)
- Autonomous vehicles
