= Health and Safety (Offences) Act 2008 =

Act of the Parliament of the United Kingdom

Health and Safety (Offences) Act 2008 (Note: Section 3(1).)
- Act of Parliament
- Parliament of the United Kingdom
- Long title: An Act to revise the mode of trial and maximum penalties applicable to certain offences relating to health and safety.
- Citation: 2008 c. 20
- Introduced by: Keith Hill (Commons); Lord Grocott (Lords)
- Territorial extent: England and Wales; Scotland; Northern Ireland; (Note: Section 3(3).)

Dates
- Royal assent: 16 October 2008
- Commencement: 16 January 2009 (Note: Section 3(2).)
Other legislation
Amends	Explosives Act 1875; Health and Safety at Work etc. Act 1974; Health and Safety at Work (Northern Ireland) Order 1978; Offshore Safety Act 1992; Offshore, and Pipelines, Safety (Northern Ireland) Order 1992; Activity Centres (Young Persons' Safety) Act 1995; Activity Centres (Young Persons' Safety) (Northern Ireland) Order 1998
Amended by	Acetylene Safety (England and Wales and Scotland) Regulations 2014

Status: Amended

History of passage through Parliament

Text of statute as originally enacted

Revised text of statute as amended

The Health and Safety (Offences) Act 2008 (c. 20) is an act of the Parliament of the United Kingdom. Its purpose was to change the "mode of trial" (i.e. whether summarily or on indictment) and maximum penalty available for certain offences against health and safety legislation. It was passed on 16 October 2008.

== Background ==
In England and Wales, health and safety offences fall under the Health and Safety at Work etc. Act 1974 and the Health and Safety (Offences) Act 2008.

According to the explanatory notes to the act, its precursors were:

- A joint review of the maximum penalties for health and safety offences carried out between February and September 1999 by the Home Office, the Department of the Environment, Transport and the Regions, and the Health and Safety Executive;
- The 2005 report Reducing administrative burdens: effective inspection and enforcement by Philip Hampton;
- The 2006 report Regulating Justice: Making Sanctions Effective by Richard B Macrory.

== Provisions ==
The act addresses fines relating to breaches in duties in the Health and Safety at Work etc. Act 1974.

The act increased the ceiling on fines in magistrates courts from £5,000 to £20,000. The act allowed for the a maximum penalty of up to two years for breaching the 1974 act.

The act came into force on 16 January 2009.

== Subsequent legislation ==
New legislation came into force on 12 March 2015 (section 85 of the Legal Aid, Sentencing and Punishment of Offenders Act 2012) granting magistrates powers to issue unlimited fines for health and safety offences, and so the maximum penalties no longer apply.

According to solicitor Victoria Glover, the reasons for the removal of the cap included a perception that fines could act as a greater deterrent to offenders, and until the change in the law, magistrates had been limited in the sentencing they could impose, the change would allow fines to be more proportionate to the impact of the offence, and while previously magistrates would commit a matter to the Crown Court where it was felt that their sentencing powers were inadequate, they would now be able to adequately sentence the offender. This would, in theory, free up the Crown Court to deal with serious offenders and reduce delay and costs previously incurred as a result of the committal, and also meant that the court which had heard all of the evidence and facts of the case could make a just decision in relation to sentencing.
