= Provision and Use of Work Equipment Regulations 1998 =

- Statutory Instrument
- Parliament of the United Kingdom
- Citation: SI 1998/2306

Dates
- Made: 15 September 1998
- Laid before Parliament: 25 September 1998
- Commencement: 5 December 1998

Other legislation
- Repeals/revokes: Operations at Unfenced Machinery (Amended Schedule) Regulations 1946; Agriculture (Circular Saws) Regulations 1959; Prescribed Dangerous Machines 1964; Power Presses Regulations 1965; Abrasive Wheels Regulations 1970; Power Presses (Amendment) Regulations 1972; Woodworking Machines Regulations 1974; Operations at Unfenced Machinery (Amendment) Regulations 1976; Factories (Standards of Lighting) (Revocation) Regulations 1978; Offshore Installations (Application of Statutory Instruments) Regulations 1984; Offshore Installations (Operational Safety, Health and Welfare and Life-Saving Appliances) (Revocations) Regulations 1989; Provision and Use of Work Equipment Regulations 1992
- Made under: Health and Safety at Work etc. Act 1974

Text of statute as originally enacted

Text of the Provision and Use of Work Equipment Regulations 1998 as in force today (including any amendments) within the United Kingdom, from legislation.gov.uk.

The Provision and Use of Work Equipment Regulations 1998 (SI 1998/2306), commonly abbreviated to PUWER 1998 or simply PUWER, is a statutory instrument of the United Kingdom. It regulates the standards of safety for equipment used in work environments. Its obligations apply to both employers and employees, as well as those who provide equipment for others to use at work.

PUWER was established under delegated powers enshrined in the Health and Safety at Work etc. Act 1974. The Health and Safety Executive (HSE) is the statutory body in charge of enforcing PUWER.

== Background ==
The PUWER 1998 legislation replaced the Provision and Use of Work Equipment Regulations 1992 (SI 1992/2932) and seeks to address, control and prevent workers risk of injury and death from equipment they use during the course of their jobs. In addition to the requirements laid out in the PUWER legislation, some types of equipment may be subject to other specific legislation. For example, equipment used for lifting (such as fork lifts) are also subject to the requirements of the Lifting Operations and Lifting Equipment Regulations 1998 (SI 1998/2307), pressure equipment must meet the Pressure Systems Safety Regulations 2000 (SI 2000/128), and personal protective equipment must meet the Personal Protective Equipment Regulations 2002 (SI 2002/1144).

The regulations apply to any employer or self-employed worker who uses equipment at work but not equipment used by the public which comes under the Health and Safety at Work etc. Act 1974.

PUWER covers all work equipment from office furniture through to complex machinery and company cars and is also applicable if a company allows a worker to use their own equipment in the work place. All new machinery should carry a CE marking or UKCA marking from its manufacturer to prove its compliance with safety laws. When a CE mark is not relevant then responsibility of the equipment’s safety and up keeping can fall to the organisation.

== Requirements of PUWER ==
The main requirements of PUWER for organisations are to ensure that the equipment used is suitable for its purpose, maintained to be safe and not risk health and safety and inspected at suitable intervals by a competent worker, who should record the results.
