= Control of Vibration at Work Regulations 2005 =

United Kingdom health and safety legislation

- Statutory Instrument
- Parliament of the United Kingdom
- Citation: SI 2005/1093

Dates
- Made: 4 April 2005
- Laid before Parliament: 7 April 2005
- Commencement: 6 July 2005

Other legislation
- Made under: Health and Safety at Work etc. Act 1974

Text of statute as originally enacted

Text of the Control of Vibration at Work Regulations 2005 as in force today (including any amendments) within the United Kingdom, from legislation.gov.uk.

The Control of Vibration at Work Regulations 2005 (SI 2005/1093) are a set of regulations created under the Health and Safety at Work etc. Act 1974 which came into force in Great Britain on 6 July 2005. The regulations place a duty on employers to reduce the risk to their employees’ health from exposure to vibration whether this is caused by the use of hand-held or hand-guided power equipment, holding materials which are being processed by machines or which is caused by the sitting or standing on industrial machines or vehicles.

== Vibration in the workplace ==
The regulations require employers to identify which of their employees may be at risk from hand arm vibration (HAV) disorders or whole-body vibration (WBV) disorders. Hand arm vibration disorders can be caused by the use of hand-held power tools and can cause painful and disabling disorders of the blood vessels, nerves and joints. The risk of suffering from a disorder is increased dependent on the exposure to vibration and can vary widely between individuals. The symptoms, which affect the blood supply to the fingers, are also known as vibration-induced white finger. Whole body vibration is transmitted via the seat when sitting down in a vehicle or machine or through the feet. Drivers of certain tractors, forklift trucks, quarrying or earth moving machinery could be exposed to WBV which could lead to back pain.

=== Exposure to vibration ===
Section 4 of the regulations details the 'exposure limit values and action values' for both HAV and WBV. The regulations require employers to make an assessment of exposure in order to identify whether the 'exposure action value' or the 'exposure limit value' is likely to be exceeded. The 'exposure action value' is the daily level, after which employers are required to take action to control exposure. The 'exposure limit value' is the maximum amount that an employee can be exposed to in a day. The values are measured using a formula which works out the average (A) exposure over an 8-hour day. The values are therefore written as A(8). The rate of vibration of a tool or piece of machinery is then measured in metres (m) per second (s) and written as m/s². In order to help employers calculate the exposure levels using the formula, the Health and Safety executive created an exposure calculator.

==== Table of exposure limits ====
	Daily exposure action value	Daily exposure limit value
Hand arm vibration	2.5 m/s² A(8)	5 m/s² A(8)
Whole body vibration	0.5 m/s² A(8)	1.15 m/s² A(8)

=== Risk assessment ===
Regulation 5 requires any employer who exposes employees to risk from vibration to make a 'suitable and sufficient' assessment of that risk. In terms of conducting the risk assessment, an employer is required to assess the daily exposure to vibration by means of consulting with employees about which processes might involve regular exposure to vibration; checking equipment handbooks to see whether they contain any warnings about exposure to vibration when using equipment; and determining whether any employees are showing any symptoms symptomatic of hand arm vibration. The risk assessment should identify people who would be at particular risk from vibration and should be conducted by someone who has a good knowledge of the work processes within the business. Consideration should be given to the magnitude, type and duration of exposure; the effects of exposure to vibration on employees whose health is at particular risk from such exposure; effects of vibration on the workplace and work equipment; any information provided by the manufacturers of the equipment; the availability of replacement equipment designed to reduce exposure to vibration; any extension of exposure at the workplace to whole-body vibration beyond normal working hours, including exposure in rest facilities supervised by the employer; specific working conditions such as low temperatures; and appropriate information obtained from health surveillance including, where possible, published information.

==== Health surveillance ====
Should the risk assessment indicate that there is a risk to health due to exposure to vibration, then employers should place employees under health surveillance with the intention of preventing or diagnosing any health effect that might result from exposure. Should, as a result of health surveillance, an employee show signs of any adverse health effect considered to have resulting from exposure to vibration, then the employer should provide the employee with information and advice and further review the risk assessment. Consideration should also be given to assigning the employee alternative work where there would be no risk from further exposure to vibration.

== Prosecutions arising from the regulations ==
On 21 January 2011 the Health and Safety Executive (HSE) announced the successful prosecution of Cheshire East council after a maintenance worker suffered a permanent loss of movement to his hands. The worker, a mechanic, had since 1984 regularly used machines such as pneumatic drills and hand-held grinders. Despite being identified as having the early stages of hand arm vibration syndrome in July 2005, the worker was reassessed in 2006 and then no further assessment was made until 2009. The court heard that the employee now had difficulty picking up small objects and that his hands became very painful in cold weather. The council was fined £5,300 and ordered to pay £5,860 costs at South Cheshire magistrates court. Chris Goddard, the investigating officer from the HSE, said "The worker was first diagnosed as developing hand arm vibration syndrome in 2005 but the council failed to take any significant action for nearly four years to stop the condition getting worse... It should have limited the amount of time he spent using vibrating equipment, or provided alternative tools. Instead, he was allowed to continue with his job without any changes... If this action had been taken, the worker's condition could have been prevented from becoming serious. Instead, he has suffered a permanent loss of movement to his hands."
