= Lifting Operations and Lifting Equipment Regulations 1998 =

Set of regulations created under the UK Health and Safety at Work etc. Act 1974

- Statutory Instrument
- Parliament of the United Kingdom
- Citation: SI 1998/2307

Dates
- Made: 15 September 1998
- Laid before Parliament: 25 September 1998
- Commencement: 5 December 1998

Other legislation
- Repeals/revokes: Quarries (Ropeways and Vehicles) Regulations 1958; Shipbuilding (Particulars of Annealing) Order 1961; Shipbuilding (Lifting Appliances, etc., Forms) Order 1961; Construction (Lifting Operations) Regulations 1961; Construction (Lifting Operations) Reports Order 1962; Construction (Lifting Operations) Prescribed Particulars Order 1962; Hoists Exemption Order 1962; Hoists Exemption (Amendment) Order 1967; Offices, Shops and Railway Premises (Hoists and Lifts) Regulations 1968; Offshore Installations (Operational Safety, Health and Welfare) Regulations 1976; Hoists and Lifts (Metrication) Regulations 1983; Construction (Metrication) Regulations 1984; Health and Safety (Miscellaneous Modifications) Regulations 1989; Lifting Plant and Equipment (Records of Test and Examination etc.) Regulations 1992
- Made under: Health and Safety at Work etc. Act 1974

Text of statute as originally enacted

Text of the Lifting Operations and Lifting Equipment Regulations 1998 as in force today (including any amendments) within the United Kingdom, from legislation.gov.uk.

The Lifting Operations and Lifting Equipment Regulations 1998 (SI 1998/2307) (LOLER) are set of regulations created under the Health and Safety at Work etc. Act 1974 which came into force in Great Britain on 5 December 1998 and replaced a number of other pieces of legislation which previously covered the use of lifting equipment. (Note: Statute Law - Lifting Operations and Lifting Equipment regulations 1998 - schedule 2, revocation of instruments The regulations replaced the 'Quarries (Ropeways and Vehicles) Regulations 1958', 'Construction (Lifting Operations) Regulations 1961', 'Offices, Shops and Railway Premises (Hoists and Lifts) Regulations 1968', 'Offshore Installations (Operational Safety, Health and Welfare) Regulations 1976', 'The Hoists and Lifts (Metrication) Regulations 1983', 'The Construction (Metrication) Regulations 1984', 'The Health and Safety (Miscellaneous Modifications) Regulations 1989', 'The Lifting Plant and Equipment (Records of Test and Examination etc.) Regulations 1992') The purpose of the regulations was to reduce the risk of injury from lifting equipment used at work. Areas covered in the regulations include the requirement for lifting equipment to be strong and stable enough for safe use and to be marked to indicate safe working loads; ensuring that any equipment is positioned and installed so as to minimise risks; that the equipment is used safely ensuring that work is planned, organised and performed by a competent person; that equipment is subject to ongoing thorough examination and where appropriate, inspection by competent people.

== Lifting equipment ==
The regulations define lifting equipment as "work equipment for lifting or lowering loads and includes its attachments used for anchoring, fixing or supporting it". The regulations involve anything which involves the lifting of goods or people at work. Equipment covered would include lifts, cranes, ropes, slings, hooks, shackles, eyebolts, rope and pulley systems and forklift trucks. The regulations apply to all workplaces and all the provisions of the Provision and Use of Work Equipment Regulations 1998 (SI 1998/2306) also apply to lifting equipment.

=== Safe working load ===
A safe working load (SWL) should, according to the regulations be marked onto lifting equipment with the relevant SWL being dependent on the configuration of the equipment, accessories for lifting such as eye bolts, lifting magnets and lifting beams should also be marked. The load itself would be based on the maximum load that the equipment can lift safely. Lifting equipment that is designed for lifting people must also be appropriately and clearly marked.

=== Passenger lifts ===
The regulations stated that all lifts provided for use with work activities should be thoroughly examined by a 'competent person' at regular intervals. Regulation 9 of the Lifting Operations and Lifting Equipment Regulations requires all employers to have their equipment thoroughly examined prior to it being put into service and after there has been any major alteration that could affect its operation. Owners or people responsible for the safe operation of a lift at work are known as 'dutyholders' and have a responsibility to ensure that the lift has been thoroughly examined and is safe to use. Lifts when in use should be thoroughly examined every six months if, at any time, the lift has been used to carry people. Lifts used to only carry loads should be examined every 12 months. Any substantial or significant changes should have been made to the equipment then this would also require an examination as would any change in operating condition which is likely to affect the integrity of the equipment.

=== LOLER Inspections ===
These are a legal requirement and should be carried out by a competent person. Though a "competent person" is not defined within the legislation, guidance is given in the HSE LOLER Approved Code of Practice and guidance which gives further details that the person should have the "appropriate practical and theoretical knowledge and experience of the lifting equipment" which would allow them to identify safety issues.

In practice, an insurance company may provide a competent person or request a third party independent inspector.

These inspections should be carried out at 6 monthly intervals for all lifting items and at least every 12 months for those that could be covered by PUWER, although a competent person may determine different time scales.

Standards state that as a minimum;

- Every six months for lifting equipment used for lifting/lowering persons.
- Every six months for lifting accessories.
- Every 12 months for all other lifting equipment not falling into either of the above categories
- A competent person may deem different time scale

LOLER Frequency (in months):

Description	loler Inspection Frequency
Equipment for lifting persons	6
Lifting accessories	6
Garage vehicle lifts	6
Cranes	12
Vehicle mounted lifts	12
Fork lift trucks	12 (or 6 depending on risk assessment)

== Employers' and workers' obligations ==
LOLER 1998 put in place four key protocols that all employers and workers must abide by.

All equipment must be safe and suitable for purpose. The manufacturer must identify any hazards associated with the equipment in question, they must then assess these hazards to bring them down to acceptable levels. All lifting equipment is normally put through an independent type testing process to establish that it will safely perform the tasks required to one of the below standards.

- BS (British Standard, used mainly in the UK)
- ISO Standards (International Standard)
- EN (Euronorm, used throughout Europe)
- CEN/CENELEC (Euronorm Standards)

The above standards are a published specification that establishes a common language and contains a technical specification or other precise criteria. They are designed to be used consistently as a rule, guideline or definition.

All personnel must be suitably trained. All manufacturers of lifting equipment are obliged to send out instructions for use of all products. The employer is then obliged to make sure employees are aware of these instructions and use the lifting equipment correctly. To achieve this the employees must be competent. Competence is achieved through experience, technical knowledge and training.

All equipment must be maintained in a safe condition. It is good practice for all personnel using lifting equipment to conduct a pre-use inspection on all items. Regulation 9 of LOLER also outlines specific requirements for the formal inspection of lifting equipment at mandatory intervals. These inspections are to be performed by a competent person and the findings of the inspections recorded. Maximum fixed periods for thorough examinations and inspection of lifting equipment as stated in regulation 9 of LOLER are:

- Equipment used for lifting persons – 6 Months
- Lifting accessories – 6 Months
- Other lifting appliances – 12 Months

or in accordance with a written scheme of examination. Any inspection record must be made in line with the requirements of schedule 1 of LOLER.

The only exception to this is: If the lifting equipment has not been used before and; In the case of lifting equipment issued with an EC declaration of conformity, the employer has possession of such declaration and it is not made more than 12 months before the lifting equipment is put into service.

== Record keeping ==
Operators of lifting equipment are legally required to ensure that reports of thorough examinations are kept available for consideration by health and safety inspectors for at least two years or until the next report, whichever is longer.

Records must be kept for all equipment. All equipment manufactured should be given a “birth certificate”. This should prove that when first made, it complied with any requirement. In Europe today, this document would normally be an EC Declaration of conformity plus a manufacturers certificate if called for by the standard worked to.

They may be kept electronically as long as you can provide a written report if requested.

To gain an understanding of the your Health and Safety requirements in the motor vehicle repair industry in full read document HSG261.

== Prosecutions arising from the regulations ==
On 17 January 2011, a Liverpool nursing home was fined £18,000 after Frances Shannon, an 81-year-old woman fell to the ground whilst being lifted out of bed.

The Christopher Grange nursing home, run by the Catholic Blind Institute, was prosecuted by the Health and Safety Executive (HSE) for failing to carry out regular checks of the sling equipment which was used to lift Mrs Shannon, who suffered a broken shoulder and injuries to her back and elbow.

Taken to the Royal Liverpool University Hospital, Mrs Shannon died the day following the incident. Speaking of the prosecution Sarah Wadham, the HSE's inspecting officer, said that the incident could have been prevented, saying to the press "There should have been regular checks of the sling and it should have been thoroughly examined at least once every six months. Sadly this did not happen."

The Catholic Blind Institute was charged under section 9 of the regulations and ordered to also pay £13,876 costs.
