= Employment Medical Advisory Service =

The Employment Medical Advisory Service is a statutory public service in Great Britain operated as part of the Field Operations Directorate of the Health and Safety Executive.

== Purpose ==
The Service was created by the Employment Medical Advisory Service Act 1972 and, as of 2009, is governed by sections Part II of the Health and Safety at Work etc. Act 1974.

Section 55 of the 1974 Act defines the Service's purpose as:

- Securing that the Secretary of State (as of 2009 the Secretary of State for Work and Pensions), the Health and Safety Executive and others concerned with the health of employed persons or trainees are informed of and advised about matters relevant to the safeguarding and improvement of the health of employees and trainees;
- Giving employees and trainees relevant information and advice on health; and
- Other purposes of the Secretary of State's functions relating to employment.

The Service is staffed by doctors and nurses who are specialists in occupational health and who are specifically able to:

- Assess how individual or group health is affected by work;
- Advise on how an individual's capacity for work is affected by his health;
- Advise on workplace first-aid provision; and
- Support health promotion programmes.

The Service's doctors and nurses enjoy all the statutory powers of other HSE inspectors.

== Bibliography ==
- Health and Safety Executive (2000) The Employment Medical Advisory Service and You, HSE5(rev1) 07/00 C200

== See also ==
- Health and Work Service
- occupational health
