= Personal Protective Equipment at Work Regulations 1992 =

- Statutory Instrument
- Parliament of the United Kingdom
- Citation: SI 1992/2966

Dates
- Made: 25 November 1992
- Laid before Parliament: 2 December 1992
- Commencement: 1 January 1993

Other legislation
- Repeals/revokes: Aerated Water Regulations 1921; Abstract of Special Regulations (Aerated Water) Order 1963; Foundries (Protective Footwear and Gaiters) Regulations 1971; Protection of Eyes Regulations 1974; Aerated Water Regulations (Metrication) Regulations 1981
- Made under: Health and Safety at Work etc. Act 1974

Text of statute as originally enacted

Text of the Personal Protective Equipment at Work Regulations 1992 as in force today (including any amendments) within the United Kingdom, from legislation.gov.uk.

The Personal Protective Equipment at Work Regulations 1992 (SI 1992/2966) are a set of regulations created under the Health and Safety at Work etc. Act 1974 which came into force in Great Britain on 1 January 1993. The regulations place a duty on every employer to ensure that suitable personal protective equipment is provided to employees who may be exposed to a risk to their health or safety while at work.

== Personal protective equipment ==
Personal protective equipment (PPE) is defined in the regulations as "all equipment (including clothing affording protection against the weather) which is intended to be worn or held by a person at work which protects them against one or more risks to their health and safety". PPE would include such things as hard hats, eye protection, safety harnesses, life jackets and safety footwear. The regulations however do not apply where requirements for PPE are detailed in other regulations, these include the:

- Control of Lead at Work Regulations 2002 (SI 2002/2676)
- Ionising Radiations Regulations 1999 (SI 1999/3232)
- Control of Asbestos Regulations 2006 (SI 2006/2739
- Control of Substances Hazardous to Health Regulations 2002 (SI 2002/2677)
- Construction (Head Protection) Regulations 1989 (SI 1989/2209)
- Control of Noise at Work Regulations 2005 (SI 2005/1643)

On 6 April 2022 the Personal Protective Equipment at Work Regulations 2022 came into force. They extended the duty on employers to provide personal protective equipment (PPE), including clothing, to those who are classified as "limb (b) workers". Unlike employees, who are "limb (a) workers" and work under an employment contract, limb (b) workers undertake work via a "contract for service" and usually have a more casual working relationship with the employer. See also: https://www.legislation.gov.uk/uksi/2022/8/contents/made

The Health and Safety at Work etc. Act 1974 also states that employers are not allowed to charge for any PPE that is used for work.

=== Other requirements ===
The regulations also impose requirements with respect to—

- compatibility of items of personal protective equipment where it is necessary to wear or use more than one item simultaneously.
- the making, review and changing of assessments in relation to the choice of personal protective equipment.
- the maintenance (including replacement and cleaning as appropriate) of personal protective equipment.
- the provision of accommodation for personal protective equipment.
- the provision of information, instruction and training.
- ensuring personal protective equipment is used.

== Prosecutions arising from the regulations ==
On 25 June 2008 a moulding company in Leicester was fined £5,300 and ordered to pay £2,134.10 after an employee suffered serious burns after he removed a mould plug during a routine operation at Harrison Castings Ltd. The burns required several skin grafts and five days in hospital for the employee. Inspector Munera Sidat said that the accident could have been prevented had the company provided the right type of gloves saying "Instead of foundry gloves which provide heat resistance, he was wearing rigger gloves which offered him very little protection. Not only did the molten metal permeate straight through the material, but the gloves were also so short that the liquid went up his jacket sleeves, making his burns worse." The company was charged under regulation 6 of the regulations which states that an assessment of the PPE provided should be made to ensure that it is suitable for the task".
