= Construction site safety =

Risk management at the workplace

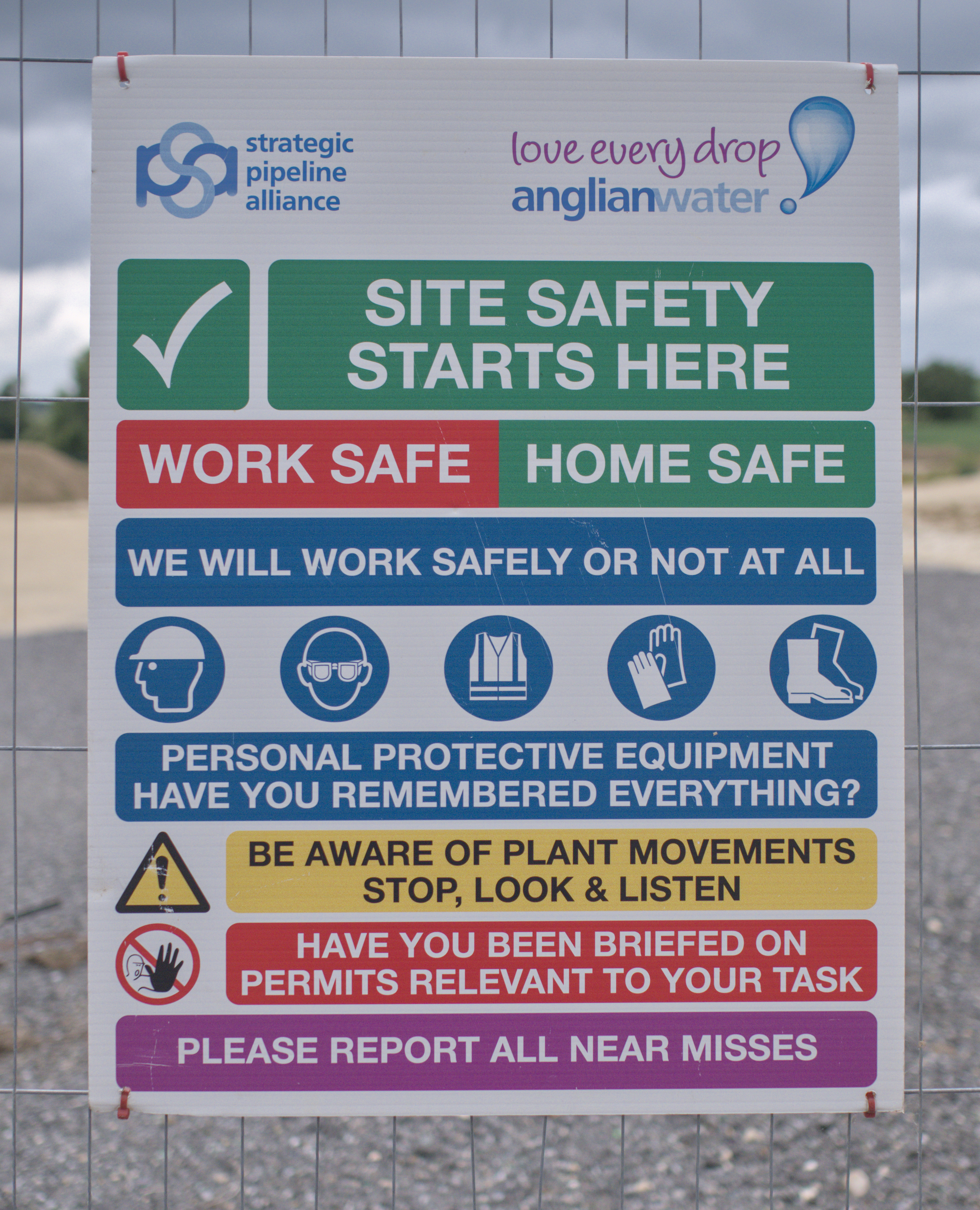
Safety sign on a construction site in England

Construction site safety is an aspect of construction-related activities concerned with protecting construction site workers and others from death, injury, disease or other health-related risks.

Construction is an often hazardous, predominantly land-based activity where site workers may be exposed to various risks, some of which remain unrecognized. Site risks can include working at height, moving machinery (vehicles, cranes, etc.) and materials, power tools and electrical equipment, hazardous substances, plus the effects of excessive noise, dust and vibration. The leading causes of construction site fatalities are falls, electrocutions, crush injuries, and caught-between injuries.

== Overview ==
According to the International Labour Organization, construction has a disproportionately high rate of recorded accidents. In 2019, the ILO said the top causes of occupational fatalities on construction sites were falls, electrocution, crush injuries, and caught-between injuries. Although construction sites face significantly the same hazards, the rate of accidents varies in different regions and countries due to a variety of safety cultures and workers' behavioral safety.

Construction incurs more occupational fatalities than any other sector in both the United States and in the European Union. In the US in 2019, 1,061, or about 20%, of worker fatalities in private industry occurred in construction. Construction has about 6% of US workers, but 17% of the fatalities - the largest number of fatalities reported for any industry sector.

In the United Kingdom, the construction industry is responsible for 31% of fatalities at work and 10% of major workplace injuries. In South Africa there are 150 fatalities and approximately 400 injuries each year related to construction sites. In Brazil, the incidence rate for all occupational fatalities is 3.6 per 100,000. Little to no information regarding construction fatalities could be found in Asia, South American, Africa, and the Antarctica. The chart below contains more countries and the rate of construction site fatalities.

Country/region	Fatalities (per annum per 100,000 workers)	Year	Notes
Australia	6.2	2018	
Canada	8.7	2008	
Europe	1.77	2018	
France	2.64	2012	
Finland	5.9	2008	
Germany	5.0	2008	
Ireland	9.80	2013	
India	10.0	2008	
Norway	3.3	2008	
Sweden	5.8	2008	
Switzerland	4.2	2008	
United Kingdom	1.62	2021	
United States of America	9.8	2014	
Israel	12.12	2015	

== Hazards ==
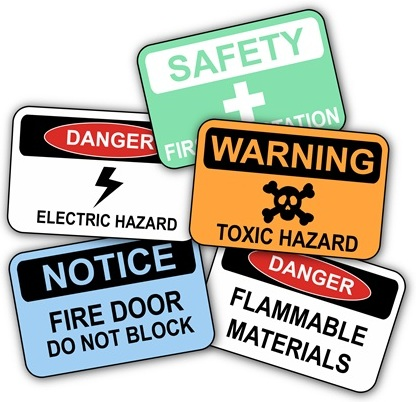
Various workplace safety signs commonly used at construction sites and industrial work environments

The leading safety hazards on construction sites include falls, being caught between objects, electrocutions, and being struck by objects. These hazards have caused injuries and deaths on construction sites throughout the world. Failures in hazard identification are often due to limited or improper training and supervision of workers. Areas where there is limited training include tasks in design for safety, safety inspection, and monitoring safety. Failure in any of these areas can result in an increased risk in exposing workers to harm in the construction environment.

Falls are the leading cause of injury in the construction industry, in particularly for elder and untrained construction workers. Several countries have regulations and guidelines for fall protections to prevent injuries and deaths. In the US the Occupational Safety and Health Administration (OSHA) Handbook (29 CFR) states that fall protection is needed in areas including but not limited to ramps, runways, and other walkways; trenching/excavations; power tools; hoist areas; holes; form-work; leading edge work; unprotected sides and edges; overhand bricklaying and related work; roofing; precast erection; wall openings; floor openings such as holes; residential construction; and other walking/working surfaces. NIOSH developed a Ladder Safety App which was designed to improve extension and step ladder safety — a concern for those working in construction or any other task that requires ladder use.

Motor vehicle crashes are another major safety hazard on construction sites. It is important to be cautious while operating motor vehicles or equipment on the site. A motor vehicle should have a service brake system, emergency brake system, and a parking brake system. All vehicles must be equipped with an audible warning system if the operator chooses to use it. Vehicles must have windows and doors, power windshield wipers, and a clear view of site from the rear window. All employees should be properly trained before using motor vehicles and equipment.

Employees on construction sites also need to be aware of dangers on the ground. Cables running across roadways were often seen until cable ramp equipment was invented to protect hoses and other equipment which had to be laid out. Another common hazard that workers may face is overexposure to heat and humidity in the environment. Overexertion in this type of weather can lead to serious heat-related illnesses such as heat stroke, heat exhaustion, and heat cramps.

Noise is also an occupational hazard, a 2019 study found that construction sites had the highest noise levels when compared to several other industries. Other hazards found on construction site include asbestos, solvents, noise, and manual handling activities.

Trenching and excavation pose a great threat to the workers in and around them. With the top injury from these incidents being a cave-in, which is when the walls of the trench collapse and buries the worker. With 1 cubic yard of soil weighing in at around 3000 pounds the soil often leads to suffocation or crushing injuries.

Power tools can create an injury risk within the construction workplace. Workers are often operating drills, saws, grinders, and nail guns during construction tasks and even with proper PPE can cause hazards to themselves or others. Improper handling and maintenance of these tools can lead to cuts, burns, electrical shock, or other serious injuries .

=== Infectious diseases ===
According to BLS data, about 1 out of 12 construction workers are exposed to infectious diseases more than once a month. This could happen because, in general, many employees continue to work while sick. Scientists studying this topic have reviewed many studies and found that the percentage of people who report going to work while sick ranges from more than a third to nearly 100%. An estimated 8 million employees in the U.S. worked while infected during the 2009 H1N1 influenza epidemic, which likely caused infection of up to 7 million co-workers.

Infectious diseases that occur among construction workers include valley fever (in the southwestern U.S., including California), histoplasmosis (especially in the Ohio and Mississippi River valleys), silico-tuberculosis, and tetanus.

Exposures from certain construction activities have been associated with an increased risk of death from infectious disease. A Swedish study of more than 300,000 male construction workers found increased mortality from pneumonia infection among workers exposed to inorganic dust, such as man-made mineral fibers, dust from cement, concrete, and quartz.

Infection prevention and control (IPC) plans should be considered as an important component of all construction site occupational safety and health plans. IPC guidelines are most successful with clear communication and mandatory training.

==== COVID-19 among construction workers ====
In 2019, nearly 60% of the construction work force had at least one COVID-19 risk factor (age 65+, medical condition, or others) for higher risk of severe illness from COVID-19. About 1.4 million or 12.3% of construction workers were age 60 or older. One in five (19.7%) construction workers had a respiratory disease, and one in four (25.8%) had cancer, diabetes, or heart, kidney, or liver disease. About 30% of construction workers were Hispanic who make up 17.7% of workers in all industries. The Center for Construction Research and Training (CPWR) has developed a COVID-19 Construction Clearinghouse with a vast array of COVID-19 resources, developed specifically for the construction industry. Additional resources can be found at the bottom of this page and workplace hazard controls for COVID-19. Construction sites should implement safety measures to prevent the spread of infection. Industry-specific guidance documents for COVID-19 have been developed by various governmental and professional organizations. The CDC provides COVID-19 guidelines for construction workers. The CDC provides the following recommendations for the worksite which are applicable to several infectious diseases: Limit close contact with others by maintaining a distance of six feet or wearing cloth face covering when this is difficult. Limit tool sharing. Clean and disinfect surfaces at the beginning and end of your shift and throughout the day. Surfaces that need cleaning include shared tools, machines, vehicles, equipment, handrails, ladders, doorknobs, and portable toilets.

=== Road construction ===
The American Recovery and Reinvestment Act of 2009 created over 12,600 road construction projects, over 10,000 of which were in progress as of 2010. Workers in highway work zones are exposed to a variety of hazards and face risk of injury and death from construction equipment as well as passing motor vehicles. Workers on foot are exposed to passing traffic, often at high speeds, while workers who operate construction vehicles are at risk of injury due to overturn, collision, or being caught in running equipment. Regardless of the task assigned, construction workers work in conditions in poor lighting, poor visibility, inclement weather, congested work areas, high volume traffic and speeds. In 2011, there were a total of 119 fatal occupation fatalities in road construction sites. In 2010 there were 37,476 injuries in work zones; about 20,000 of those were to construction workers. Causes of road work site injuries included being struck by objects, trucks or mobile equipment (35%), falls or slips (20%), overexertion (15%), transportation incidents (12%), and exposure to harmful substances or environments (5%). Causes of fatalities included getting hit by trucks (58%), mobile machinery (22%), and automobiles (13%).

Road construction safety remains a priority among workers. Several states have implemented campaigns addressing construction zone dangers and encouraging motorists to use caution when driving through work zones.

National Work Zone Safety Awareness Week is held yearly. The national event began in 1999 and has gained popularity and media attention each year since. The purpose of the event is to draw national attention to motorist and worker safety issues in work zones.

=== Common chemicals ===
Construction workers exposure to hazardous chemicals on construction sites is common. Hazardous chemicals can be found in many materials construction workers interact with daily life in paints, glues, fuels, dust, and insulation. Many construction sites use cements that contain harmful mineral binders, such as crystalline silica, calcium oxide, and chromium. Many of these chemicals are corrosive if in contact with the skin and damage the lungs if inhaled. Continuous skin contact with wet cement can eventually cause chemical burns. Chromium can cause allergic reactions, such as respiratory allergies, leading to occupational asthma. Exposure to cement dust by eye contact and/or inhalation can also have vast effects on workers' health leading to lung to term chronic diseases or blindness. Construction site workers can also be exposed to asbestos, most commonly used in heat insulation. The asbestos fibers can cause respiratory and lung problems if inhaled.

Harmful chemicals are also found in paint used by workers on construction sites. Paints contain materials like binders, solvents, and pigments that give the desired color. Resins can be made of many things like polyurethane, epoxy, vinyl acetate, and other similar compounds. Resin is most commonly used to protect materials from corrosion and damage but can also be absorbed through the skin. Solvents are used for binders and varnishes. Solvents are most commonly petroleum-based chemicals mixed with pigment and binders. Constant exposure to solvents by inhalation could increase the risk of chronic illness. A common compound found in solvents is benzene which is widely known to cause leukemia from exposure. Some solvents can also cause hearing loss from their ototoxicity. Pigments might contain heavy metals such as zinc and lead. Lead-based paints are extremely toxic and when exposed to the body can cause many harmful effects. Lead is absorbed into the body when workers inhale lead as dust, fumes, or mist from the paint. Children born to parents who were exposed to excess lead levels are more likely to have birth defects, mental disabilities, or behavioral disorders or to die during the first year of childhood.

PPE for Chemical Protection

In construction sites, there are many chemical hazards that serve as potential threats to the workers. Personal protective equipment (PPE) is required by law to protect and minimize exposure to these hazards. The Occupational Safety and Health Administration requires many categories of PPE to meet Hazard Communication Standards. Hazard communication standards provide criteria for hazard classification, chemical labels, safety data sheets, and information on training.

Personal protective equipment like face shields, gloves, respirators, and protective clothing is important in order to protect construction workers from chemical hazard threats like skin absorption, chemical burns, and inhalation of fumes. There have been studies shown that prove that there is a higher prevalence of work-related accidents among construction workers when there is low use of PPE and a lower prevalence of accidents when there is a higher use of PPE.

Studies also show that PPE reduces other health-related risks such as respiratory illnesses and chemical-related conditions in environments with high chemical exposure. (2 peer-reviewed). Although it is important for construction workers to wear the proper PPE especially when handling chemical equipment, it is also important that they are properly trained. The Joint Commission emphasizes the importance of proper PPE training. They promote the regular need for audits and assessments of worker compliance and the condition of PPE in order to maintain a safe work environment.

Compliance with OSHA requirements, coupled with appropriate PPE selection and frequent worker training, is essential for lowering the dangers associated with chemical exposure in construction site settings. PPE is not just a critical barrier to danger, but it is also an essential component of a safety culture that protects workers' long-term health.

== Hazard controls ==
A video describing how a construction framer implemented a safety program to prevent falls on construction sites

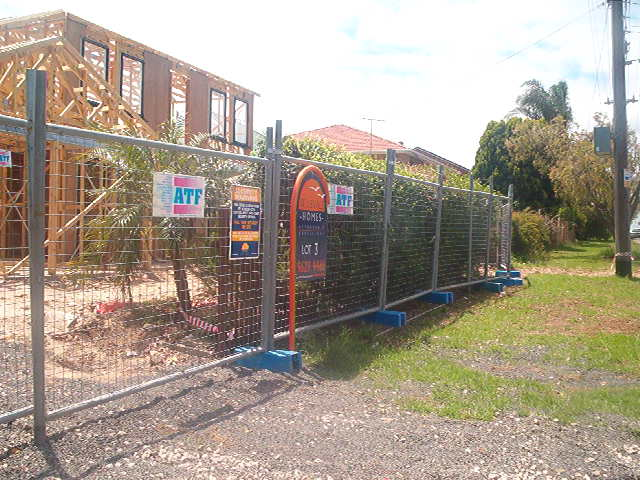
Temporary fencing on a building site in Sydney, Australia

Site preparation aids in preventing injury and death on construction sites. Site preparation includes removing debris, leveling the ground, filling holes, cutting tree roots, and marking gas, water, and electric pipelines. Another prevention method on the construction site is to provide a scaffold that is rigid and sufficient to carry its own weight plus four times the maximum intended load without settling or displacement.

Ways to prevent injuries and improve safety include:

- Management safety
- Integrate safety as a part of the job
- Design a safety management system and setup KPIs
- Apply technology to help overall site monitoring
- Create accountability at all levels
- Take safety into account during the project planning process
- Make sure the contractors are pre-qualified for safety
- Make sure the workers are properly trained in appropriate areas
- Have a fall protection system
- Prevent and address substance abuse to employees
- Review accidents and near misses, as well as regular inspections
- Innovative safety training, e.g. adoption of virtual reality in training
- Replace some of the works by robots (many workers may worry that this will decrease their employment rate)
- Adoption of BIM with three dimensional printing to make the building model first before put into real practice

The employees or employers are responsible for providing fall protection systems and to ensure the use of systems. Fall protection can be provided by guardrail systems, safety net systems, personal fall arrest systems, positioning device systems, and warning line systems. Making sure that ladders are long enough to safely reach the work area to prevent injury. Stairway, treads, and walkways must be free of dangerous objects, debris and materials. A registered professional engineer should design a protective system for trenches 20 feet deep or greater for safety reasons. To prevent injury with cranes, they should be inspected for any damage. The operator should know the maximum weight of the load that the crane is to lift. All operators should be trained and certified to ensure that they operate forklifts safely.

There are multiple digital tools that can be implemented to monitor over all site safety- including online inductions to construction sites, a digital site log, online construction site safety measurement and digital access control. Digital software keeps all construction inspections in one place and provides a permanent safety record for reporting purposes to help ensure job sites and equipment are safe.

Operational Excellence Model to improve safety for construction organizations

There are 16 safety drivers associated with this model to improve safety for construction organizations:

1. Recognition & Reward
2. Employee Engagement
3. Subcontractor Management
4. Training & Competence
5. Risk Awareness, Management & Tolerance
6. Learning Organization
7. Human Performance
8. Transformational Leadership
9. Shared Values, Beliefs, and Assumptions
10. Strategic Safety Communication
11. Just & Fair Practices and Procedures
12. Worksite Organization
13. Owner's Role
14. Digital transformation
15. Knowledge transfer management
16. Automation process

Each safety driver mentioned above has some sub-elements attributed to it.

=== Education and safety ===
Construction workers need to be properly trained and educated on the task or job before working, which will assist in preventing injuries and deaths. There are many methods of training construction workers. One method is coaching construction site foremen to include safety in their daily verbal exchanges with workers to reduce work-related accidents. It is important that the workers use the same language to assure the best communication. In recent years, apart from traditional face to face safety knowledge sharing, mobile apps also make knowledge sharing possible.

Another method is ensuring that all workers know how to properly use electronics, conveyors, skid-steer, trucks, aerial lifts, and other equipment on the construction site. Equipment on the job site must be properly maintained and inspected regularly before and after each shift. The equipment inspection system will help the operator make sure that a machine is mechanically sound and in safe operating conditions. An employee should be assigned to inspect equipment to insure proper safety. Equipment should have lights and reflectors if intended for night use. The glass in the cab of the equipment must be safety glass in some countries. The equipment must be used for its intended task at all times on the job site to insure workers' safety.

Each construction site should have a construction site manager. This is an occupational health and safety specialist who designs and implements safety regulations to minimize injuries and accidents. He or she also is in charge of conducting daily safety audits and inspections to ensure compliance with government regulations. Most construction site managers have an entry level experience or higher degree.

Before any excavation takes place, the contractor is responsible for notifying all applicable companies that excavation work is being performed. During excavation, the contractor is responsible for providing a safe work environment for employees and pedestrians.

Access and egress are also important parts of excavation safety. Ramps used by equipment must be designed by a person qualified in structural design. No person is allowed to cross underneath or stand underneath any loading or digging equipment. Employees are to remain at a safe distance from all equipment while it is operational. Employees who have training and education in the above areas will benefit their co-workers and themselves on the construction site.

Trenches require protective structures with in them when workers enter the excavation area. Structures include sloping of the trench walls, placing trench bowes to help prevent soil collapse. OSHA states that inspections of the trenches should occur before every work shift starts and after any event such as weather, heavy rain or any ground movement. Proper training needs to occur with all employees thatb may be working in and around trenching/excavation sites.

==== OSHA's Hazard Communication Standard in Construction Industries ====
Hazard Communication Standard (HCS) refers to laws created by OSHA for the purpose of keeping workers safe by having standards about how information about chemical hazards at jobsites are communicated to workers. This is meant to make sure that employees understand the safety-relevant facts of the chemicals they're working around, allowing them to take protective measures against any chemical hazards. They were first put into effect in 1983, but at this time did not include the construction industry. Then, in 1987, they were expanded to include every industry where workers are exposed to potentially hazardous chemicals which includes the construction industry. As written in OSHA's regulations, the HCS of the construction industry are the same as those OSHA set forth generally, even if they are contracted by a company within a company.

In the hierarchy of hazard controls, Hazard Communication Standards are an example of administrative controls, meaning that they involve work processes that reduce exposure to hazards. A HCS-compliant employer provides factually correct labels on chemical containers, safety data sheets (SDS) on any hazardous chemical present, workplace training involving hazardous chemicals, and a physical, written hazard communication program. These four requirements work in tandem to keep construction employees safer from chemical hazards than they would otherwise be by decreasing their exposure to the chemicals they work with.

==== National Safety Stand Down ====
Every spring in the United States, many safety organizations sponsor a voluntary week-long campaign to raise awareness about falls in construction, the leading cause of death for construction workers. This event provides employers the opportunity to discuss safety hazards such as falls and how to prevent them. Even if a company doesn't have employees exposed to fall hazards, the safety awareness campaign can still be used to discuss other job hazards, prevention methods, and company safety policies.

In 2016, falls from elevation caused 92 of the 115 fatalities in the roofing industry as well as 384 of the 991 overall construction fatalities recorded. In 2016, falls from elevation were the leading cause of construction worker deaths in the U.S., fatally injuring more than 310 construction workers seriously injuring another 10,350 by falls from elevation. In 2016, the main causes of these construction related fall fatalities were falls from roofs (124), ladders (104), and scaffolds (60). Eighty one percent of deaths from roofs occur in the construction industry, 57% of deaths from ladders occur in the construction industry, and 86% of deaths from scaffolds occur in the construction industry.

Several of the top 10 most frequently cited OSHA violations every year involve fall-protection safety standards. Annual number of construction fatalities in the United States are listed in the table below:

Annual Number of Construction Fatalities in the United States
Year	Fatal Falls	Other Fatal Injuries	Total
2017	386	585	971
2016	384	607	991
2015	364	573	937
2014	359	540	899
2013	302	526	828
2012	290	516	806

The program was originally launched as a two-year project on Workers Memorial Day in 2012 to raise awareness about preventing falls in construction, but due to its success, it has been continued at the start of every construction season. In 2015, over 150 public events were held across the country, with over 150,000 workers and 1.5 million US Air Force personnel participating.

Organizations partnering with OSHA to sponsor this annual event include the National Institute for Occupational Safety and Health (NIOSH), the Center for Construction Research and Training (CPWR), the American Society of Safety Professionals (ASSP), the National Safety Council, and many others. Resources to assist employers in finding activities are also available from multiple sources. The National Association of Home Builders (NAHB) and NIOSH have made several fall-prevention videos available to the public on YouTube, among others. The National Roofing Contractors Association has published three video webinars available for viewing. The Lergent Developers has published a mobile app available for download, which helps workers to find authorized fall prevention course provider.

=== Personal protective equipment ===
Hard hats, steel-toe boots and reflective safety vests are perhaps the most common personal protective equipment worn by construction workers around the world. A risk assessment may deem that other protective equipment is appropriate, such as gloves, goggles, or high-visibility clothing.

=== Company size ===
As the company size increases, the incidence rate drops due to the provision of better occupational health and safety programs.

== Hazards and hazard controls for non-workers ==
Many construction sites cannot completely exclude non-workers. Road construction sites must often allow traffic to pass through. This places non-workers at some degree of risk.

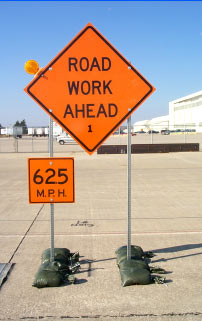
This sign and advisory plate penetrated the wind-shield and roof of a car in a side-impact test crash. A safer sign would have stiffer uprights, no advisory plate and the flashing light would be moved to the point of the sign to spread the impact force.

Road construction sites are blocked off and traffic is redirected. The sites and vehicles are protected by signs and barricades. However, sometimes even these signs and barricades can be a hazard to vehicle traffic. For example, improperly designed barricades can cause cars that strike them to roll over or even be thrown into the air. Even a simple safety sign can penetrate the windshield or roof of a car if it strikes from certain angles.

The majority of deaths in construction are caused by hazards relating to construction activity. However, many deaths are also caused by non construction activities, such as electrical hazards.

== Construction safety research in academia ==
Construction safety has been considered as a hot topic in academic research. As per the latest research. the largest number of published construction safety documents were published by scholars from the US and China; the total number of published articles by these two countries was 1,125, at 56% of the 2000 articles that were published. Both countries showed high levels of research collaboration. While the results suggest that economic development may drive academic construction safety research, there has been an increase in construction safety research conducted by developing countries in recent years, probably due to an improvement in their economic development. While authors' keywords evidenced the popularity of research on safety management and climate, the network analysis on all keywords, i.e. keywords given by Web of Science and authors, suggest that construction safety research focused on three areas: construction safety management, the relationship between people and construction safety, and the protection and health of workers' impact on construction safety. There is a new interdisciplinary research trend where construction safety combines with digital technologies, with the largest number involving deep learning. Other trends focus on machine learning, Building Information Modelling, machine learning and visualisation.

== Regulation ==
=== European Union ===
In Europe, the European Agency for Safety and Health at Work coordinates actions at the EU and national levels and the Directorate-General for Employment, Social Affairs and Inclusion is responsible for regulation at the EU level.

Under European Union Law, there are European Union Directives in place to protect workers, notably Directive 89/391 (the Framework Directive) and Directive 92/57 (the Temporary and Mobile Sites Directive). This legislation is transposed into the Member States and places requirements on employers (and others) to assess and protect workers health and safety.

=== United Kingdom ===
In the United Kingdom, the Health and Safety Executive (HSE) is responsible for standards enforcement, while in Northern Ireland, the Health and Safety Executive for Northern Ireland (HSENI) is responsible. In Ireland, the Health and Safety Authority (HSA) is responsible for standards and enforcement.

=== United States ===
In the United States, the Occupational Safety and Health Administration (OSHA) sets and enforces standards concerning workplace safety and health. Efforts have been made in the first decade of the 21st century to improve safety for both road workers and drivers in construction zones. In 2004, Title 23 Part 630 Subpart J of the Code of Federal Regulations was updated by Congress to include new regulations that direct state agencies to systematically create and adopt comprehensive plans to address safety in road construction zones that receive federal funding.

OSHA implemented the Final Rule to Improve Tracking of Workplace Injuries and Illnesses, which went into effect January 1, 2017. It requires employers to submit incident data electronically to OSHA. This data will enable OSHA to use enforcement and compliance assistance resources more efficiently. The amount of data required varies by company and industry.

According to the latest statistics from OSHA, there are more than 13 job-related deaths each day in the U.S. with one in five of these being in the construction industry.

== Health Disparities Among Hispanic Construction Workers in the United States ==
Hispanics make up a sizeable portion of the construction workforce: in 2019, 30.4% of construction workers were Hispanic, compared to 17.7% of workers in all industries. Approximately 1 in 4 US construction workers did not have health insurance in 2018, more than double the uninsured rate among all US workers. Almost half (48%) or 2 in 4 Hispanic construction workers were uninsured, more than triple that of their non-Hispanic counterparts (13%). Compared to their White counterparts, the rate of fatal injuries for Hispanics is 41% higher. In addition, research has found that nearly half of all work-associated fatalities among Hispanics occur in small construction establishments with 1-10 employees. In the period 2003–2008, falling from elevated heights was the main contributor to 40% of all deaths for Hispanic construction workers. In terms of nonfatal injuries experienced by Hispanic workers, contact with objects (43.0%) was the leading cause. Of great concern is that minority workers have a higher risk of suffering from occupational illness and injury. US labor laws that create barriers to organizing a union, immigration policies, unregulated, unsafe work places, lack of health insurance, misclassified workers who lose protections, being an essential worker, not having sick leave, distrust of the healthcare system, language barriers, and the cost of missing work are just some of the possible contributing factors to this health disparity.

== Construction safety informatics and the role of artificial intelligence on construction safety ==
Li (2019) proposes that there are three generations of construction safety informatics which are relevant to construction safety enhancement:

1. The first generation of construction safety informatics consisted of technologies that relied completely on control by human beings; for example, structural equation modelling requires the work of an analyst.
2. The second generation of construction safety informatics included smart features such as the Internet of Things which can send information to human operators, without human intervention — from sensors, etc. Yet, these "smart" tools cannot learn and improve on their own capabilities.
3. The third generation of construction safety informatics uses state-of-the-art AI, to mimic human behavior and think, act, learn and improve on its own decision making. All that is required is that the relevant information is fed to these systems, so that they can be 'taught'.

== See also ==
- Automatic track warning system – Occupational safety device
- NIOSH Power Tools Database
- List of occupational health and safety awards
- Occupational hygiene
- Occupational safety and health – Field concerned with the safety, health and welfare of people at work
- Roof edge protection – Rails installed on roofs to protect construction and roofing workers
- Prevention through design, also known as Safety by design – Reduction of occupational hazards by early planning in the design process
- Tagging system – System of recording and displaying the status of a machine or equipment
- Temporary fencing – Temporary enclosure of a place
- Tower Crane Anti-Collision System – Safety system for tower cranes
