= Control of Noise at Work Regulations 2005 =

- Statutory Instrument
- Parliament of the United Kingdom
- Citation: SI 2005/1643

Dates
- Made: 18 June 2005
- Laid before Parliament: 28 June 2005
- Commencement: 6 April 2006

Other legislation
- Repeals/revokes: Noise at Work Regulations 1989
- Made under: Health and Safety at Work etc. Act 1974
- Transposes: European Directive 2003/10/EC

Text of statute as originally enacted

Text of the Control of Noise at Work Regulations 2005 as in force today (including any amendments) within the United Kingdom, from legislation.gov.uk.

The Control of Noise at Work Regulations 2005 (SI 2005/1643) place a duty on employers within Great Britain to reduce the risk to their employees health by controlling the noise they are exposed to whilst at work. The regulations were established under the Health and Safety at Work etc. Act 1974 and implement European Council directive 2003/10/EC. The regulations replaced the 'Noise at work regulations 1989' which previously covered noise in the workplace. The regulations came into force for most industries on 6 April 2006 with the music and entertainment sectors coming into line two years later on 21 April 2008. In Northern Ireland the legislation is dealt with in the Control of Noise at Work Regulations (Northern Ireland) 2006 (SR(NI) 2006/1).

Everyone in the engineering environment is exposed to noise and could suffer temporary or permanent hearing loss, the control of noise at work regulations require employers to eliminate or reduce noise levels.

== Differences with previous legislation ==
The regulations replaced the Noise at Work Regulations 1989 (SI 1989/1790) which had been introduced as a response to the 1986 European directive 86/188/EEC. In 2001 the Swedish presidency of the EU put forward a proposal which would seek to replace the existing directive with a new one, 2003/10/EC. This directive replaced the previous and in the UK became the Control of Noise at Work Regulations 2005. Differences between the pieces of legislation included a reduction in the threshold for hearing and protection and the introduction of noise control. It introduced the daily exposure limit value as well as a permitted weekly value. It also introduced requirements for health surveillance and hearing testing.

== Exposure limits ==
The regulations introduced a number of exposure limits in relation to noise in the workplace. They defined the average level of noise that an employee could be exposed to during an average day or week as well as what the peak pressure would be within that period. The exposure levels were set in decibels (dB) and given either an 'A' weighting, representing the average exposure or a 'C' rating, representing the peak exposure. The lower exposure level of 80 dB(A) meant that should an employee's average exposure be over that amount then the employer would be required to assess the risk to workers health and provide employees with information and training. The upper exposure level of 85 dB(A) represented the limit at which employers needed to provide hearing protection and hearing zones. The exposure limit value of 87 dB(A) represented the limit at which employees should not be exposed.

=== Table of exposure limits ===
	Average level of exposure, dB(A)	Peak sound pressure, dB(C)
Lower Exposure Limit	80	135
Upper Exposure Limit	85	137
Exposure Limit Value	87	140

== Risk assessment ==
The regulations are one of a number of health and safety pieces of legislation that require the 'suitable and sufficient' assessment of risks to employees as a result of work activities. By law the employer has to assess the 'noise problem' at work then a risk assessment would need to be carried out and plan put in place for how to deal with it:

- identify where the risk is and who might be affected.
- contain a reliable estimate of the employees exposure and compare the exposure with the exposure limits and values
- identify what is needed to comply with the law i.e. whether noise control measures or hearing protection may be needed.
- identify any employees who may need to be provided with 'health surveillance' and whether any are at particular risk.

== Prosecutions arising from the regulations ==
In October 2011 a factory in Burnley which manufactured flooring surfaces for horse riding centers was fined £16,000 after it failed to put practical measures in place to comply with an improvement notice from a specialist Health and Safety Executive (HSE) inspector. The staff at the factory worked several hours a day near a granulator machine, which shredded material into tiny pieces and which was "as loud as a chainsaw". Although the court heard that some changes had been made, the daily exposure to employees working in the factory remained high. HSE inspector Matthew Lea said "The Control of Noise at Work Regulations require employers to put measures in place to ensure that their employees can work safely, without putting their hearing at risk." Speaking on the dangers of exposure to noise he said "Noise-induced hearing loss is a degenerative condition and the ear cannot repair itself. It's therefore important that employers take these dangers seriously as there is no going back once hearing is damaged."
