= Tower crane anti-collision system =

Safety system for tower cranes

A tower crane anti-collision system is an operator support system for tower cranes on construction sites. It helps an operator to anticipate the risk of contact between the moving parts of a tower crane and other tower cranes and structures. In the event that a collision becomes imminent, the system can send a command to the crane's control system, ordering it to slow down or stop. An anti-collision system can describe an isolated system installed on an individual tower crane. It can also describe a site wide coordinated system, installed on many tower cranes in close proximity.

== History ==
Developments in tower crane design and the increasing complexity of construction sites in the 1970’s and 1980’s led to an increase in the quantity and proximity of tower cranes on construction sites. This increased the risk of collisions between cranes, particularly when their operating areas overlapped.

The first tower crane anti-collision systems were developed in France in 1985 by SMIE.

A Ministry of Labour directive issued in 1987 made anti-collision systems compulsory on all tower cranes in France.

In 2011, Hong Kong introduced a "Code of Practice for the Safe Use of Tower Cranes" and Singapore introduced a "Workplace Safety and Health construction Regulation". Both required the provision of an anti-collision system where more than one tower crane is in use.

In 2015, Luxembourg required automatic devices to be installed to avoid the risk of collision between tower cranes.

== Collision avoidance with structures and other tower cranes ==
Various sensors are used to measure the position, velocity and angle of each tower crane’s moving parts. These sensors can be part of the anti-collision system or the crane. This information is sent via radio link to a computer and a display in the operator’s cabin. Several features commonly found across tower crane anti-collision systems use this data.

=== Zoning ===
Anti-collision systems allow prohibited zones to be defined. These are areas (such as schools, transport links, electrical power lines and areas beyond the site boundary) where the crane is not allowed to operate.

=== Situational awareness ===
The operator's cabin hosts a display showing the tower crane's position, movement and operating area. Where the tower crane’s operating area overlaps with other cranes or prohibited zones these are also displayed. The system alerts the operator when the crane is approaching a prohibited area or another crane.

=== Tower crane control ===
Anti-collision systems are often connected to the tower crane’s control system. This allows the anti-collision system to automatically slow down and stop the crane if there is a risk of an accident. The operator is then prevented from moving the crane towards the danger and can only move it away.

=== Supervisory system ===
A supervisory system is a typical feature of an anti-collision system that covers an entire construction site. It allows a site supervisor to have a complete view of tower crane operations on a construction site. It also allows for centralised configuration and maintenance of the system.

=== Fail-safe operation ===
If a fault occurs on a tower crane's anti-collision system, or it is bypassed, other tower cranes will be prevented from operating within the volume of the faulty system.

== Collision avoidance with other vehicles ==
Anti-collision lights are required on tower cranes operating in or near to airfield flight paths. Three red flashing lights are positioned on each end and the top of the crane. They provide a visual warning to aircraft pilots.

== Limitations ==
Tower crane anti-collision systems do not prevent collisions with mobile construction equipment such as mobile cranes and aerial work platforms.

== Standards ==
A draft standard setting out the functional requirements of tower crane anti-collision devices and systems is open for comment. It is BS EN 17076. Anti-collision devices and systems for tower crane. Safety characteristics and requirements.

== See also ==
- Crane (machine) - Tower crane
- Anti-collision light
