= Lifting equipment =

Equipment that can be used to lift and lower loads

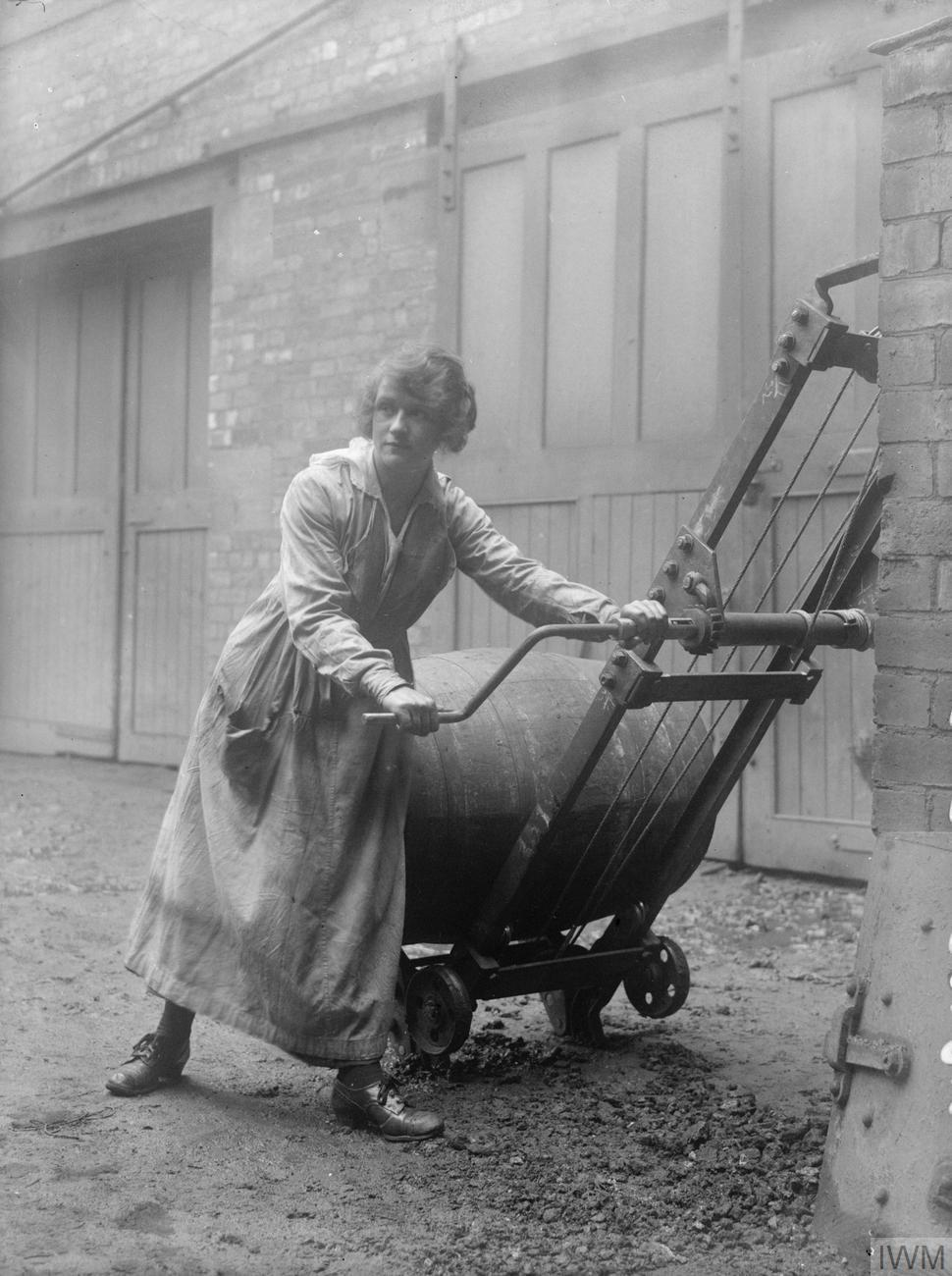
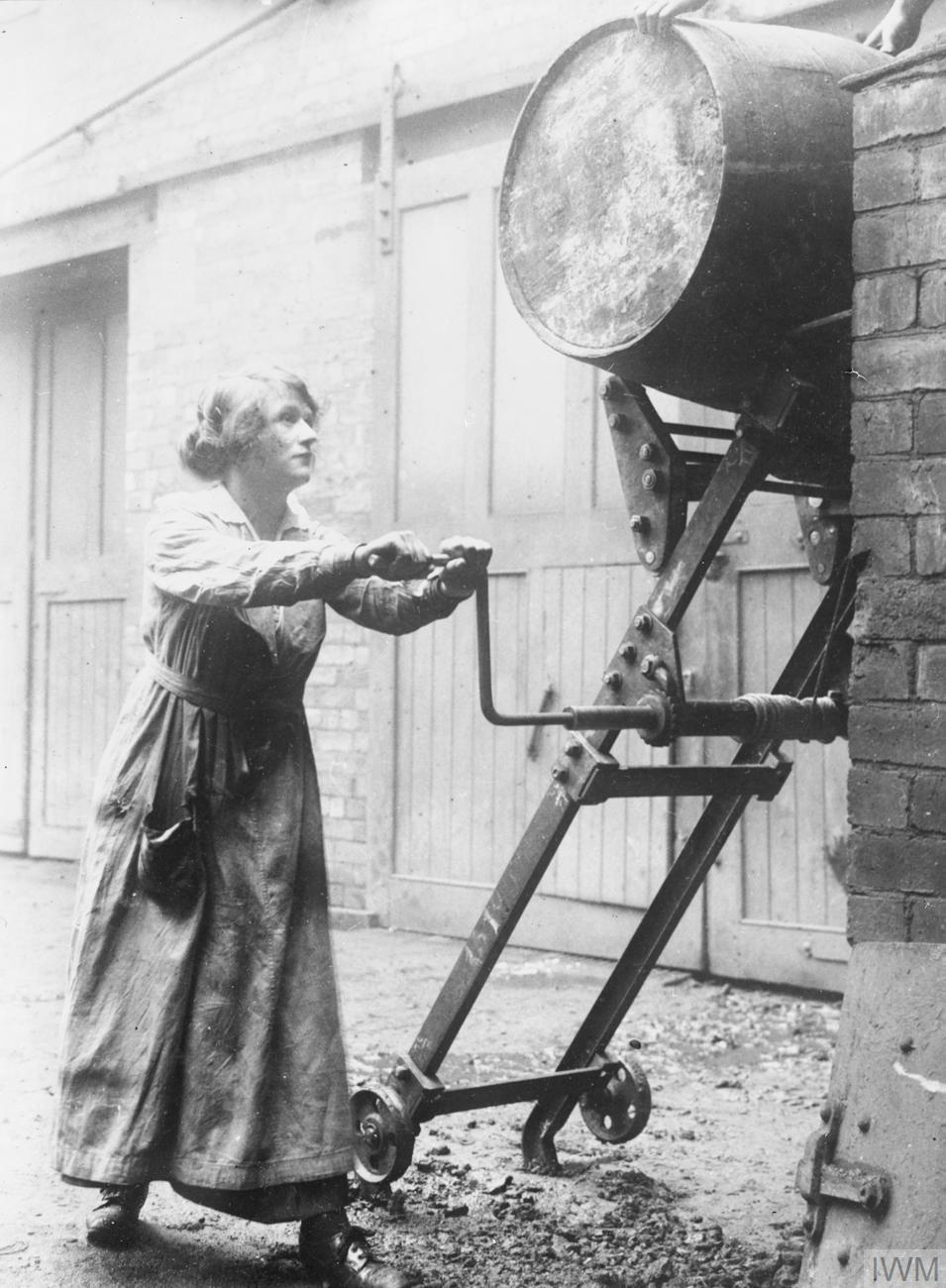
A worker demonstrating a barrel elevator, 1918

Lifting a heavy object with a block and tackle

Lifting equipment, also known as lifting gear, is a general term for any equipment that can be used to lift and lower loads. Types of lifting equipment include heavy machinery such as the patient lift, overhead cranes, forklifts, jacks, building cradles, and passenger lifts, and can also include smaller accessories such as chains, hooks, and rope. Generally, this equipment is used to move material that cannot be moved with manual labor, and are tools used in most work environments, such as warehouses, and is a requirement for most construction projects, such as bridges and buildings. This equipment can also be used to equip a larger number of packages and goods, requiring less persons to move material. Lifting equipment includes any form of equipment that is used for vertical lifting, and equipment used to move material horizontally is not considered lifting equipment, nor is equipment designed to support. As lifting equipment can be dangerous to use, it is a common subject of safety regulations in most countries, and heavy machinery usually requires certified workers to limit workplace injury.

== Safety issues ==
Failure or misuse of heavy machinery can lead to severe or fatal injury, leading regulations to be one of the largest debates in labor laws across the world. Each country sets its own regulations, and enforces different aspects of workplace safety when using lifting equipment.

=== In the United States ===
The Occupational Safety and Health Administration sets regulations for all equipment. Contractors are forced to uphold usually strict rules to ensure safety of workers. All machinery is required to be developed by a certified engineer, contractors must follow manufacturer procedures, all users be professionally trained before operating equipment, and equipment must be inspected regularly.

=== In the United Kingdom ===
The Health and Safety Executive sets regulations on equipment in the United Kingdom, under the Lifting Operations and Lifting Equipment Regulations. These regulations require equipment be registered on a Statutory Inspection Report Form, is adequate for the task, be subject to routine inspection, and the use of the equipment be properly planned out.

=== Working load limit ===
Lifting equipment can be assigned a working load limit (WLL) in the interests of avoiding failure. It is sometimes known as safe working load (SWL), but this alternative term is sometimes avoided due to giving the connotation of safety, which may not be guaranteed.

The working load limit is calculated by dividing the "minimum breaking load" of the equipment by a safety factor. Working load limit as a concept is not restricted to lifting, being also relevant for mooring ropes. Minimum breaking load is also known under the terms of "minimum breaking strength" or "minimum breaking force". Working load limit of ropes are usually much smaller than their minimum breaking load.

== See also ==
- Crane
- Forklift
- Lewis (lifting appliance)
- Overhead crane
- Patient lift
- Simple machine
