= Roof edge protection =

Rails installed on roofs to protect construction and roofing workers

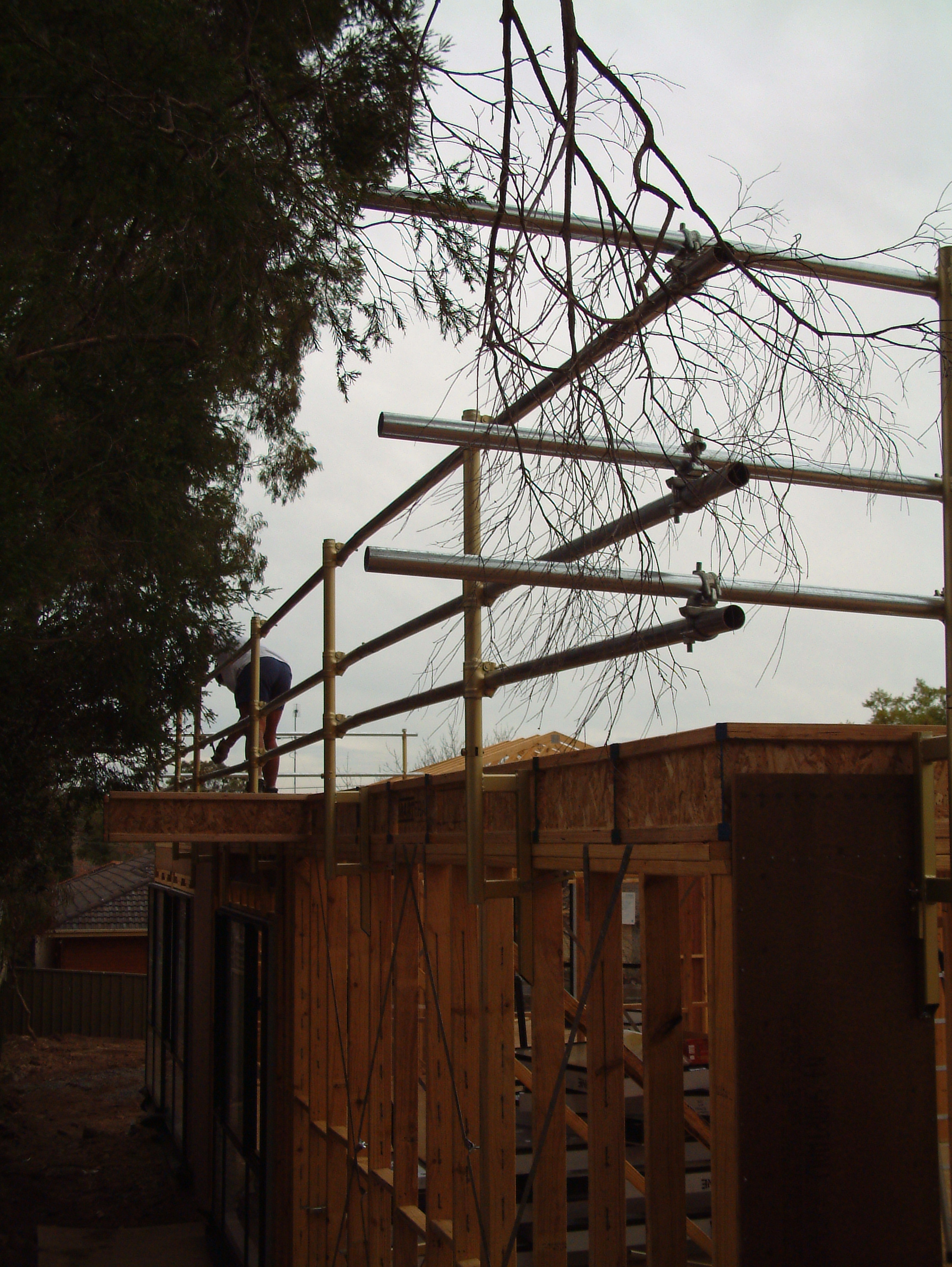
Guardrail on residential building site in Australia

Roof edge protection is fall protection equipment most commonly used during the construction of commercial buildings or residential housing. They can be used along with timber, steel, or concrete structures. It often consists of a toe board, a main guard rail and an intermediate rail.". Roof edge protection can take the form of personal fall arrest systems (PFAS), fall restraint systems, guardrail systems, warning line systems, safety monitors, or ladders. Since construction is one of the most dangerous professions in the world, roof edge protection offers much-needed protection against falls from heights which is one of the primary causes of fatalities for workers.

== History ==
With a combination of the Industrial Revolution taking place, the United States receiving a huge influx of immigrants, and investments in commercial and residential buildings, the construction industry grew rapidly. However, this came at the cost of many fatalities and injuries since men were required to work without any standardized safety precautions and their employers were not incentivized to provide any safety equipment.

In 1877, the state of Massachusetts began implementing safety and health legislation. Even though the first safety laws primarily concentrated on the working conditions and safety practices within factories and other workplaces, it paved the way for efforts to be geared towards roof edge protection as construction skyrocketed in U.S. cities. In the following years, equipment such as guards were developed to protect workers from falling from edges. By 1913, the National Council for Industrial Safety was established in order to collect data and information on industrial deaths and this provided the government with evidence for the need of injury and fatality prevention at work.

By the 1920s, body belts were the standard for fall protection but there was a risk of the belt slipping over the user's shoulders in the event of a fall. Users also had to manually tie and retie lines for the body belt. At this time, steel guardrails were also present as highway guardrails but this became common practice in manufacturing and industrial settings as well. In the building of the Golden Gate Bridge, the danger and difficulty of the construction project also allowed for safety to take center stage. Civil engineer Joseph Baermann Strauss insisted on safety measures such as hardhats, glare-free goggles, and most notably, a safety net under the developing bridge to prevent fatalities from falling. In the 1940s, a better alternative to the body belt which was the safety harness was also created. By the 1970s, the Occupational Safety and Hazard Administration (OSHA) was established and began issuing standard updates for fall protection in the construction industry. In 1994, OSHA also issued Subpart M Fall Protection Standard which required roof edge protection to be in place where employees were working six feet or more above a lower level. Since then, OSHA has periodically introduced and updated its requirements and recommendations for fall protection to meet the changing circumstances within the construction industry.

== Legal requirements ==
Edge protection is often required to meet strict technical safety standards set by government authorities. Depending on occupational safety requirements in any given country or region, the quality of edge protection used on building and construction sites can be examined by government inspectors.

Many US federal and state laws require building contractors to implement measures to prevent workers falling from heights. These laws often expressly require the use of edge protection or harness systems. In the UK edge protection guidelines are set out by the Edge Protection Federation's Code of Practice, which itself has been written to comply with BS EN 13374.

== See also ==
- Construction site safety
- Occupational safety
- Roofer
- Fall protection
