= Health and Safety at Work etc. Act 1974 =

Act of the Parliament of the United Kingdom

Health and Safety at Work etc. Act 1974 (Note: Section 85(1).)
- Act of Parliament
- Parliament of the United Kingdom
- Long title: An Act to make further provision for securing the health, safety and welfare of persons at work, for protecting others against risks to health or safety in connection with the activities of persons at work, for controlling the keeping and use and preventing the unlawful acquisition, possession and use of dangerous substances, and for controlling certain emissions into the atmosphere; to make further provision with respect to the employment medical advisory service; to amend the law relating to building regulations, and the Building (Scotland) Act 1959; and for connected purposes.
- Citation: 1974 c. 37
- Introduced by: Secretary of State for Employment Michael Foot 22 March 1974 (Commons)
- Territorial extent: England and Wales; Scotland; Northern Ireland; offshore; (Note: Section 84.)

Dates
- Royal assent: 31 July 1974
- Commencement: from 1 October 1974 (Note: Section 85(2). The Health and Safety at Work etc. Act 1974 (Commencement No.1) Order 1974 (SI 1974/1439).)
Other legislation
Amended by	House of Commons Disqualification Act 1975; Fatal Accidents and Sudden Deaths Inquiry (Scotland) Act 1976; Forgery and Counterfeiting Act 1981; Senior Courts Act 1981; Building Act 1984; Companies Consolidation (Consequential Provisions) Act 1985; Statute Law (Repeals) Act 1986; Consumer Protection Act 1987; Coroners Act 1988; Atomic Energy Act 1989; Offshore Safety Act 1992; Statute Law (Repeals) Act 1993; Gas Act 1995; Fireworks Act 2003; Railways Act 2005; Manufacture and Storage of Explosives Regulations 2005; Health and Safety (Offences) Act 2008; Inquiries into Fatal Accidents and Sudden Deaths etc. (Scotland) Act 2016; Policing and Crime Act 2017; Sentencing Act 2020
Relates to	Environmental Protection Act 1990

Status: Amended

Text of statute as originally enacted

Text of the Health and Safety at Work etc. Act 1974 as in force today (including any amendments) within the United Kingdom, from legislation.gov.uk.

The Health and Safety at Work etc. Act 1974 (c. 37) (HSWA 1974, HASWA or HASAWA) is an act of the Parliament of the United Kingdom that as of 2011 defines the fundamental structure and authority for the encouragement, regulation and enforcement of workplace health, safety and welfare within the United Kingdom.

The act defines general duties on employers, employees, contractors, suppliers of goods and substances for use at work, persons in control of work premises, and those who manage and maintain them, and persons in general. The act enables a broad regime of regulation by government ministers through statutory instruments which has, in the years since 1974, generated an extensive system of specific provisions for various industries, disciplines and risks. It established a system of public supervision through the creation of the Health and Safety Commission and Health and Safety Executive, since merged, and bestows extensive enforcement powers, ultimately backed by criminal sanctions extending to unlimited fines and imprisonment for up to two years. Further, the act provides a critical interface with the law of the European Union on workplace health and safety.

== Background ==
Secretary of State for Employment and Productivity Barbara Castle introduced an Employed Persons (Health and Safety) Bill in 1970 but the debate around the bill soon generated a belief that it did not address fundamental issues of workplace safety. In the same year, the Occupational Safety and Health Act was passed into United States federal law. As a result, a committee of inquiry chaired by Lord Robens was established towards the end of Harold Wilson's first government. The Conservative Party then came to power following the 1970 United Kingdom general election, preferring to wait for the Robens Report which was published in 1972. Conservative Secretary of State for Employment William Whitelaw introduced a new bill on 28 January 1974 but Labour were returned to power in the February 1974 United Kingdom general election and the bill was again lost. The new Labour administration finally secured the passage of a bill that year.

== Structure of the act ==
The act lays down general principles for the management of health and safety at work, enabling the creation of specific requirements through regulations enacted as statutory instruments or through a code of practice. For example, the Control of Substances Hazardous to Health Regulations 2002 (SI 2002/2677), the Management of Health and Safety at Work Regulations 1999, the Personal Protective Equipment at Work Regulations 1992 (SI 1992/2966) and the Health and Safety (First-Aid) Regulations 1981 are all statutory instruments that lay down detailed requirements. It was also the intention of the act to rationalise the existing complex and confused system of legislation (section 1(2)).

Since the accession of the UK to the European Union (EU) in 1972, much health and safety regulation has needed to comply with the law of the European Union and statutory instruments under the act have been enacted in order to implement EU directives. In particular, the act is the principal means of complying with Directive 89/391/EEC on health and safety at work. Further important changes to section 6, duties in respect of articles and substances used at work, were made by the Consumer Protection Act 1987 in order to implement the Product Liability Directive 85/374/EEC.

== Objectives ==
Section 1 sets out the objectives of the act as:

- Securing the health, safety and welfare of persons at work;
- Protecting persons, other than persons at work, against risks to health or safety arising out of or in connection with the activities of persons at work;
- Controlling the keeping and use of explosive or highly flammable or otherwise dangerous substances, and generally preventing the unlawful acquisition, possession and use of such substances.

As originally enacted, there was a fourth objective:

- Controlling the emission into the atmosphere of noxious or offensive substances;

but this provision was repealed when control of emissions was brought under a uniform scheme of legislation by the Environmental Protection Act 1990. In general, the other provisions about emissions in the original act have subsequently been repealed.

== General duties ==
=== Duties of employers ===
Section 2 states that "It shall be the duty of every employer to ensure, so far as is reasonably practicable, the health, safety and welfare at work of all his/her employees" (emphasis added), and in particular that such a duty extends to:

- Provision and maintenance of plant and systems of work that are, so far as is reasonably practicable, safe and without risks to health;
- Arrangements for ensuring, so far as is reasonably practicable, safety and absence of risks to health in connection with the use, handling, storage and transport of articles and substances;
- Provision of such information, instruction, training and supervision as is necessary to ensure, so far as is reasonably practicable, the health and safety at work of his employees;
- So far as is reasonably practicable as regards any place of work under the employer's control, the maintenance of it in a condition that is safe and without risks to health and the provision and maintenance of means of access to and egress from it that are safe and without such risks;
- Provision and maintenance of a working environment for his employees that is, so far as is reasonably practicable, safe, without risks to health, and adequate as regards facilities and arrangements for their welfare at work.

Section 3(1) imposes a duty on employers to conduct their undertaking so as to ensure, so far as is reasonably practicable, the safety of persons other than employees. This could include, for example, contractors, visitors, the general public and clients.

Employers must also prepare and keep under review a safety policy and to bring it to the attention of his employees (section 2(2)). Trade unions may appoint safety representatives and demand safety committees. The representatives have a right to be consulted on safety issues (sections 2(4), (6) and (7)). Since 1996 employers have had a duty to consult all employees on safety matters. No employer may charge an employee for provision of health and safety arrangements (section 9).

The act does not apply to domestic servants (section 51).

=== Duties of self-employed persons ===
Section 3(2) requires that some self-employed persons conduct their undertaking in a way which does not expose non-employees - or themselves - to risks to their health and safety, so far as is reasonably practicable. This duty applies only to self-employed persons who conduct undertakings of a "prescribed description" (as defined by regulation 2 of The Health and Safety at Work etc. Act 1974 (General Duties of Self-Employed Persons) (Prescribed Undertakings) Regulations 2015). The prescribed undertakings are agricultural activity; asbestos; construction; gas; genetically modified organisms; railways; or any other activity which may pose a risk to the health and safety of a person other than the self-employed person or their employees.

=== Duties of persons having control of premises ===
Section 4 defines a duty of occupiers of premises, for example commercial landlords, managers of serviced office accommodation, and also maintenance contractors, towards people who use those premises for work. Those premises, and the means of entry and exit, must be, as far as reasonably practicable, safe and without risks to health.

=== Duties towards articles used at work ===
An "article for use at work" is any (s.53(1)):

- Plant (that is, machinery) designed for use or operation, whether exclusively or not, by persons at work, and
- Article designed for use as a component in any such plant.

Section 6(1) defines the duty of any person who designs, manufactures, imports or supplies any article for use at work to:

- Ensure, so far as is reasonably practicable, that the article is so designed and constructed that it will be safe and without risks to health at all times when it is being set, used, cleaned or maintained by a person at work;
- Perform such testing and examination as may be necessary to ensure safety;
- Take such steps as are necessary to secure that persons supplied with the article are provided with adequate information about the use for which the article is designed, or has been tested, and about any conditions necessary to ensure that it will be safe and without risks to health at all times, including when it is being dismantled or disposed of; and
- Take such steps as are necessary to secure, so far as is reasonably practicable, that persons are provided with all such revisions of information as are necessary by reason of its becoming known that anything gives rise to a serious risk to health or safety.

A person may rely on testing done by others so long as it is reasonable for him to do so (s.6(6)). A person may rely on a written undertaking by another person to ensure the safety of an item (s.6(8)) Designers and manufacturers must carry out research to identify and eliminate risks, as far as reasonably practicable (s.6(2)). Erectors and installers have responsibilities to ensure, as far as reasonably practicable, that an article is so erected and installed that it will be safe and without risks to health at all times when it is being set, used, cleaned or maintained by a person at work (s.6(3)).

Section 6 was extended by the Consumer Protection Act 1987 to cover fairground equipment and its use by persons at work and enjoyment by members of the public.

=== Duties towards substances used at work ===
Section 6(4) defines the duty of any person who manufactures, imports or supplies any substance for use at work to:

- Ensure, so far as is reasonably practicable, that the substance will be safe and without risks to health at all times when it is being used, handled, processed, stored or transported by a person at work or in work premises;
- Perform such testing and examination as may be necessary to ensure safety;
- Take such steps as are necessary to secure that persons supplied with the substance are provided with adequate information about any risks to health or safety to which the inherent properties of the substance may give rise, about the results of any relevant tests which have been carried out on or in connection with the substance, and about any conditions necessary to ensure that the substance will be safe and without risks to health and when the substance is disposed of; and
- Take such steps as are necessary to secure, so far as is reasonably practicable, that persons are provided with all such revisions of information as are necessary by reason of its becoming known that anything gives rise to a serious risk to health or safety.

Similar to the regulations concerning articles used at work, a person may also rely on testing or written undertaking by another person to ensure the safety of substances used at work. The duty to identify and eliminate risks of substances rests with manufacturers.

=== Exceptions for supply of articles and substances ===
The duties only extend to persons in business or acting by way of trade, even though not for profit, and only to matters within their control (s.6(7)). Persons who import into the UK are not relieved of liability for activities such as design and manufacture that took place outside the UK and over which they had control. Finance companies who supply articles or substances by way of hire purchase or credit agreement have no duties under section 6 (s.6(9)).

=== Duties of employees ===
Under section 7 all employees have a duty while at work to:

- Take reasonable care for the health and safety of him/herself and of other persons who may be affected by his/her acts or omissions at work; and
- Co-operate with employers or other persons so far as is necessary to enable them to perform their duties or requirements under the Act.

=== Duties of persons in general ===
Section 8 requires that "no person shall intentionally or recklessly interfere with or misuse anything provided in the interests of health, safety or welfare in pursuance of any of the relevant statutory provisions."

=== Reasonably practicable ===
What is reasonably practicable is a question of fact. The Court of Appeal held in 1949 that

in every case, it is the risk that has to be weighed against the measures necessary to eliminate the risk. The greater the risk, no doubt, the less will be the weight to be given to the factor of cost.

— Lord Justice Tucker

and:

Reasonably practicable is a narrower term than 'physically possible' and seems to me to imply that a computation must be made by the owner in which the quantum of risk is placed on one scale and the sacrifice involved in the measures necessary for averting the risk (whether in money, time or trouble) is placed in the other, and that, if it be shown that there is a gross disproportion between them – the risk being insignificant in relation to the sacrifice – the defendants discharge the onus on them.

— Lord Justice Asquith

Where a criminal prosecution arises from a breach of duty and the accused's defence is that it would not have been practicable or reasonably practicable to act otherwise, the burden of proof falls on the defendant (s.40). The prosecution have the burden of showing beyond reasonable doubt that certain acts were done or omitted to provide a prima facie case against the accused. Only if the prosecution succeed in this does the defendant have the burden of proving that the alternative was not practicable or reasonably practicable, but only on the balance of probabilities. The Court of Appeal held in 2002 that this requirement was compliant with article 6(2) of the European Convention on Human Rights (ECHR) as to presumption of innocence. The Court of Appeal noted that the "reverse burden" applied to purely regulatory breaches, rather than genuine criminal offences potentially punishable by imprisonment. However, the Health and Safety (Offences) Act 2008 extended the sentences available for these offences to include imprisonment for two years. Before it was passed, the Department for Work and Pensions expressed the opinion that this is still compliant with the ECHR as it "strikes a fair balance between the fundamental right of the individual and the general interests of the community".

In 2005, the European Commission challenged the defence as noncompliant with Directive 89/391/EEC, which states that (Art.5(1) and (4)):

"The employer shall have a duty to ensure the safety and health of workers in every aspect related to the work." but that "This Directive shall not restrict the option of Member States to provide for the exclusion or the limitation of employers' responsibility where occurrences are due to unusual and unforeseeable circumstances, beyond the employers' control, or to exceptional events, the consequences of which could not have been avoided despite the exercise of all due care."

The commission argued that the "reasonably practicable" defence was much broader than allowed under the directive but in 2007 the European Court of Justice found for the UK that the defence was in fact compliant.

=== Development risks defence ===
Section 6(10) was added by the Consumer Protection Act 1987 disapplies duties as to articles and substances used at work where a risk "is shown to be one the occurrence of which could not reasonably be foreseen". This is known as the development risks defence.

== Health and Safety Executive ==

Section 10 created two bodies corporate, the Health and Safety Commission and Health and Safety Executive, who performed their respective functions on behalf of the Crown (section 10 and Schedule 2). The bodies had wide powers to further their objectives by all means other than borrowing money (ss.11(6), 13). On 1 April 2008, the two bodies merged, the aggregate taking the name Health and Safety Executive.

=== Health and Safety Commission ===
Before its merger with the HSE, the commission consisted of a chairman and between six and nine other people, appointed by the appropriate Secretary of State, after consultation (section 10(2)-(4)). The commission's duties were to (section 11(2)):

- assist and encourage persons concerned with matters relevant to the operation of the objectives of the Act;
- make arrangements for and encourage research and publication, training and information in connection with its work;
- make arrangements for securing that government departments, employers, employees, their respective representative organisations, and other persons are provided with an information and advisory service and are kept informed of, and adequately advised on, such matters;
- propose regulations.

The commission further had to keep the Secretary of State informed of its plans and ensure alignment with the policies of the Secretary of State, giving effect to any directions given to it (section 11(3)). The Secretary of State could give directions to the commission (section 12). On 1 April 2006, the Commission ceased to have responsibility for railway safety. The commission could delegate any of its functions to, or otherwise direct, the Executive (section 11(4)) and could direct the Executive to hold a public inquiry or other investigation into any accident (section 14). However, as of 1 April 2008, all its powers and responsibilities were transferred to the Executive.

=== Health and Safety Executive ===
The executive consists of a chairman and between 7 and 11 other people, all appointed by the Secretary of State, as of 2008, the Secretary of State for Work and Pensions (Schedule 2). Before the 2008 merger, the executive had to carry out all functions delegated to it, or otherwise directed by, the commission and provide the Secretary of State with information and expert advice (section 11(5)). The executive is responsible for enforcement of the act and regulations made under it though the Secretary of State may transfer some of the duties to local government (section 18).

== Health and safety regulations ==
The Secretary of State has broad powers to make health and safety regulations (section 15). Breach of regulations can lead to criminal prosecution under section 33. Further, the Health and Safety Executive can issue codes of practice (section 16). Though breach of a code of practice is not in itself a criminal offence it may be evidential towards a criminal breach under the Act (section 17)

== Enforcement ==
Because individual litigation is unlikely, given that employees may find the regulations complex, the Health and Safety Executive enforces the Act. However, the HSE may also delegate its functions to local government under section 18, which allows for a more decentralised and targeted approach to regulation. Any enforcing authority may appoint inspectors with a written document stating their powers. This is as evidence of their authority (section 19). Enforcing authorities may indemnify the inspector against any civil litigation if he has acted in the honest belief that he was within his powers (section 26). Local government bodies who may be enforcing authorities are:

- England:
  - County councils where there are no district councils;
  - District councils;
  - London borough councils;
  - The Common Council of the City of London;
  - The Sub-Treasurer of the Inner Temple;
  - The Under-Treasurer of the Middle Temple;
  - The Council of the Isles of Scilly;
- Scotland:
  - Councils for a local government area; and
- Wales:
  - County councils or county borough councils.

Local government bodies can be enforcing authorities in respect of several workplaces and activities including offices, shops, retail and wholesale distribution, hotel and catering establishments, petrol filling stations, residential care homes and the leisure industry. As of 2008, 410 such bodies have responsibility in 1.1 million workplaces. From 1 April 2006 the Office of Rail Regulation (ORR) became the enforcing authority for the Health and Safety at Work etc. Act 1974 and laws made under it, for all health and safety matters relating to the operation of a railway (or tramway).

=== Inspectors ===
Under section, inspectors have the following powers:

- enter any premises which he has reason to believe it is necessary for him to enter so enforce the Act, at any reasonable time, or in a dangerous situation;
- take with him a constable if he has reasonable cause to fear any serious obstruction in the execution of his duty;
- take with him:
  - any other person duly authorised by the enforcing authority; and
  - any equipment or materials required for any purpose for which the power of entry is being exercised;
- make such examination and investigation as may in any circumstances be necessary for the purpose of enforcing the Act;
- direct that the premises, or any part of them, or anything therein, shall be left undisturbed, whether generally or in particular respects, for so long as is reasonably necessary for the purpose of any examination or investigation;
- take such measurements and photographs and make such recordings as he considers necessary for the purpose of examination or investigation;
- take samples of any articles or substances found, and of the atmosphere in or in the vicinity of the premises;
- cause an article or substance which appears to be a danger to health or safety, to be dismantled or subjected to any process or test, but not so as to damage or destroy it unless this is in the circumstances necessary to enforce the Act;
- take possession of such an article and detain it for so long as is necessary in order to:
  - examine it and do to it anything which he has power to do;
  - ensure that it is not tampered with before his examination of it is completed;
  - Ensure that it is available for use as evidence in any prosecution or any proceedings relating to a notice under sections 21 or 22;
- require any person whom he has reasonable cause to believe to be able to give any information relevant to any examination or investigation to answer (in the absence of persons other than a person nominated by him to be present and any persons whom the inspector may allow to be present) such questions as the inspector thinks fit to ask and to sign a declaration of the truth of his answers;
- require the production of, inspect, and take copies of or of any entry in:
  - any books or documents which by virtue of any of the relevant statutory provisions are required to be kept; and
  - any other books or documents which it is necessary for him to see for the purposes of any examination or investigation;
- require any person to afford him such facilities and assistance with respect to any matters or things within that person's control or in relation to which that person has responsibilities as are necessary to enable the inspector to exercise any of the powers conferred on him;
- any other power which is necessary to enforce the Act.

The Consumer Protection Act 1987 added the power for a customs officer to seize imported goods for up to 48 hours (section 25A). In observance of the principle of a right to silence, answers given to questions that the inspector required a person to answer cannot be used as evidence against him, nor his spouse or civil partner (section 20(7)), neither can the inspector require production of a document protected by legal professional privilege (section 20(8)).

=== Improvement notices ===
If an inspector is of the opinion that a person is currently contravening the Act; or has contravened the Act in the past in circumstances that make it likely that the contravention will continue or be repeated he may serve him with an improvement notice (section 21):

- stating that he believes that the Act is being contravened or will be in the future;
- specifying the relevant provisions of the Act, giving particulars of the reasons why he is of that opinion; and
- requiring the person to remedy the contravention within a period, ending not earlier than the period within which an appeal can be brought under section 24, as of 2008, 21 days.

Appeal against a notice is within 21 days to an employment tribunal who may appoint one or more assessors to sit with them (s.24).

An appeal against an Improvement Notice has the effect of suspending the Improvement Notice (see section 24(3)(a)).

=== Prohibition notices ===
If an inspector is of the opinion that activities are being carried on, or are likely to be carried on, involving the risk of serious personal injury, he may serve him with a prohibition notice (section 22):

- stating that the inspector is of that opinion;
- specifying the matters which in his opinion give, or will give rise, to that risk;
- where in his opinion any of those matters involves, or will involve a contravention of the Act:
  - stating that he is of that opinion;
  - specifying the relevant statutory provisions; and
  - giving particulars of the reasons why he is of that opinion; and
- directing that the activities shall not be carried on unless the deficiencies have been remedied.

The notice may start immediately or at the end of a specified period (section 22(4). Appeal against a notice is within 21 days to an employment tribunal who may appoint one or more assessors to sit with them (section 24).

An appeal against a Prohibition Notice, unlike an appeal against an Improvement Notice (see above) does not suspend the Prohibition Notice. However, the appellant may make an application for a direction that the Prohibition Notice is suspended whilst the appeal proceedings are ongoing (see section 24(3)(b)).

=== Prosecution ===
Section 33(1) creates 15 criminal offences including breach of a duty under the Act or a regulation, contravention of a notice, or obstructing an inspector. In England and Wales prosecution under the Act could originally only be brought by an inspector or with the permission of the Director of Public Prosecutions but the Environment Agency was also authorised on 1 April 1996 (section 38). All offences under the Act are either summary offences or offences triable either way so inspectors start prosecutions by laying an information before the magistrates' court. Inspectors can themselves be authorised to exercise rights of audience before the Magistrates even though not legally qualified (section 39).

If a person, by some act or omission, causes another person to commit the actus reus of an offence under the Act then they too are guilty of an offence, even if the other person was not prosecuted or could not be prosecuted because they were the Crown (section 36). Where an offence is committed by a body corporate with the consent or connivance, or by the neglect, of a director, manager, secretary or a member acting in a managerial capacity, that individual too is guilty of an offence (section 37).

Where a person is convicted under the act, the court can order that he remedy the state of affairs or can order forfeiture of an item in question (section 42).

== Civil liability ==
There is no civil liability for breach of statutory duty in respect of sections 2 to 8 and there is liability for breach of health and safety regulations except to the extent that any regulations provide otherwise (section 47, as amended by the Enterprise and Regulatory Reform Act 2013). However, a breach not actionable in itself may be evidential towards a claim for common law negligence. In particular, a criminal conviction may be given in evidence.

== Liability of the Crown ==
The Crown is bound by health and safety regulations and by the Act itself save for (section 48):

- Notices (sections 21–25); and
- Criminal offences (sections 33–42);

— though an employee of the Crown can be criminally liable (s.48(2)). The Act was extended to the police on 1 July 1998 by the Police (Health and Safety) Act 1997 (section 51A). The Secretary of State may, "to the extent that it appears to him requisite or expedient to do so in the interests of the safety of the State or the safe custody of persons lawfully detained" exempt the Crown by Order in Council (section 48(4)). In 1987, section 10 of the Crown Proceedings Act 1947 was repealed to allow military personnel to sue the Ministry of Defence and bring the Armed Services into line with the Act.

== Other provisions ==
Sections 55 to 60 provide for the continued existence of the Employment Medical Advisory Service in England and Wales. Section 68 is a Henry VIII clause enabling the Secretary of State to amend certain provisions of the Act by Statutory Instrument rather than Act of Parliament.

Sections 61 to 76 originally enabled the HSE to create and amend building regulations and gave them other powers over buildings control and approval. These sections were repealed by the Building Act 1984 which replaced them by a general scheme of building regulations.

== Territorial extent ==
The act originally applied in England and Wales, Scotland (in part) and Northern Ireland (in part) (section 84). Its provisions were re-enacted for Northern Ireland in 1978 with enforcement made the responsibility of the Health and Safety Agency for Northern Ireland. The Agency's name was changed to the Health and Safety Executive for Northern Ireland in 1998.

Section 84(3) allowed the Secretary of State to extend, by Order in Council, the provisions outside England, Wales and Scotland. In 1995, the provisions were extended to offshore installations, wells and pipelines in UK territorial waters, mines extending into territorial waters and certain other engineering activities in territorial waters. Activities on a ship under the direction of its master are excluded.

== Performance of the act ==
Reviewing performance of the act in 2008 Lord Grocott observed:

Between 1974 and 2007, the number of fatal injuries to employees fell by 73 per cent; the number of reported non-fatal injuries fell by 70 per cent. Between 1974 and 2007, the rate of injuries per 100,000 employees fell by a huge 76 per cent, and Britain had the lowest rate of fatal injuries in the European Union in 2003, which is the most recent year for which figures are available. The EU average was 2.5 fatalities per 100,000 workers; the figure in the UK was 1.1.

== See also ==
- UK labour law
- English tort law

== Bibliography ==
Books

- Various authors, Tolley's Health and Safety at Work Handbook 2008 (Butterworths 2007) ISBN 0-7545-3318-2
- Lord Mackay of Clashfern, Halsbury's Laws of England (4th edn 2004) Vol 20, "Health and Safety at Work"
- JR Ridley and J Channing, Safety at Work (Butterworth-Heinemann 2003) ISBN 0-7506-5493-7
- J Stranks, Health and Safety Law (5th edn Prentice Hall 2005) ISBN 0-13-197646-X

Articles

- RC Simpson, 'Safety and Health at Work: Report of the Robens Committee 1970-72' (1973) 36(2) Modern Law Review 192–198
- W Cullen, The development of safety legislation (Royal Society of Edinburgh 1996)
- HSE, Thirty years on and looking forward: The development and future of the health and safety system in Great Britain (2004)
