= List of statutory instruments of the United Kingdom, 1992 =

This is a complete list of all 1,922 statutory instruments published in the United Kingdom in the year 1992.

== Statutory instruments ==
=== 1-499 ===
==== 1–100 ====
- North Hull Housing Action Trust (Transfer of Property) Order 1992 (S.I. 1992/1)
- Merchant Shipping (Radio Installations) Regulations 1992 (S.I. 1992/3)
- British Technology Group Act 1991 (Modification and Saving) Order 1992 (S.I. 1992/8)
- Local Government Act 1988 (Competition) (South Wight Borough Council) (Sports and Leisure) Regulations 1992 (S.I. 1992/9)
- Income Tax (Building Societies) (Audit Powers) Regulations 1992 (S.I. 1992/10)
- Income Tax (Building Societies) (Dividends and Interest) (Amendment) Regulations 1992 (S.I. 1992/11)
- Income Tax (Deposit-takers) (Audit Powers) Regulations 1992 (S.I. 1992/12)
- Income Tax (Deposit-takers) (Interest Payments) (Amendment) Regulations 1992 (S.I. 1992/13)
- Income Tax (Deposit-takers) (Non-residents) Regulations 1992 (S.I. 1992/14)
- Income Tax (Interest Payments) (Information Powers) Regulations 1992 (S.I. 1992/15)
- National Health Service (General Dental Services) (Miscellaneous Amendments) (Scotland) Regulations 1992 (S.I. 1992/16)
- Eastbourne Water Company (Constitution and Regulation) Order 1992 (S.I. 1992/17)
- Mid-Sussex Water Company (Constitution and Regulation) Order 1992 (S.I. 1992/18)
- West Kent Water Company (Constitution and Regulation) Order 1992 (S.I. 1992/19)
- Industrial Training Levy (Construction Board) Order 1992 (S.I. 1992/21)
- Oil Lamps (Safety) (Revocation) Regulations 1992 (S.I. 1992/23)
- National Health Service (General Dental Services) (Miscellaneous Amendments) Regulations 1992 (S.I. 1992/24)
- Motor Vehicles (Type Approval for Goods Vehicles) (Great Britain) (Amendment) Regulations 1992 (S.I. 1992/25)
- Highland Regional Council (Kilfinnan Burn) Water Order 1992 (S.I. 1992/30)
- Environmental Protection (Controls on Injurious Substances) Regulations 1992 (S.I. 1992/31)
- Medicines (Medicated Animal Feeding Stuffs) Regulations 1992 (S.I. 1992/32)
- Medicines (Veterinary Drugs) (Pharmacy and Merchants' List) Order 1992 (S.I. 1992/33)
- Insolvency Fees (Amendment) Order 1992 (S.I. 1992/34)
- Non-Domestic Rates (Scotland) Regulations 1992 (S.I. 1992/35)
- Clean Air (Units of Measurement) Regulations 1992 (S.I. 1992/36)
- Taxes (Relief for Gifts) (Designated Educational Establishments) Regulations 1992 (S.I. 1992/42)
- Central Office of Information Trading Fund (Variation) Order 1992 (S.I. 1992/43)
- Watermark Disease (Local Authorities) (Amendment) Order 1992 (S.I. 1992/44)
- Sheep Scab Order 1992 (S.I. 1992/45)
- Opencast Coal (Rate of Interest on Compensation) Order 1992 (S.I. 1992/46)
- Cheshire, Derbyshire, Hereford and Worcester and Staffordshire (County Boundaries) (Variation) Order 1992 (S.I. 1992/48)
- Income-related Benefits Schemes (Miscellaneous Amendments) Regulations 1992 (S.I. 1992/50)
- Environmentally Sensitive Areas (West Penwith) Designation (Amendment) Order 1992 (S.I. 1992/51)
- Environmentally Sensitive Areas (South Downs) Designation Order 1992 (S.I. 1992/52)
- Environmentally Sensitive Areas (Somerset Levels and Moors) Designation Order 1992 (S.I. 1992/53)
- Environmentally Sensitive Areas (The Broads) Designation Order 1992 (S.I. 1992/54)
- Environmentally Sensitive Areas (Pennine Dales) Designation Order 1992 (S.I. 1992/55)
- Agricultural or Forestry Tractors and Tractor Components (Type Approval) (Fees) (Revocation) Regulations 1992 (S.I. 1992/56)
- Food Safety Act 1990 (Commencement No. 3) Order 1992 (S.I. 1992/57)
- Ports Act 1991 (Levy on Disposals of Land, etc.) Order 1992 (S.I. 1992/58)
- Veterinary Surgeons and Veterinary Practitioners (Registration) (Amendment) Regulations Order of Council 1992 (S.I. 1992/64)
- Education (School Information) (Amendment) (England) Regulations 1992 (S.I. 1992/70)
- Planning and Compensation Act 1991 (Commencement No. 6) (Scotland) Order 1992 (S.I. 1992/71)
- Smoke Control Areas (Authorised Fuels) (Amendment) Regulations 1992 (S.I. 1992/72)
- Local Government (Publication of Information About Unused and Underused Land) (England) Regulations 1992 (S.I. 1992/73)
- Criminal Justice (International Co-operation) Act 1990 (Enforcement Officers) Order 1992 (S.I. 1992/77)
- New Towns (Defects Grants) (Payments to District Councils) (Extensions of Time) (Amendment) Order 1992 (S.I. 1992/78)
- Offshore Installations (Safety Zones) Order 1992 (S.I. 1992/79)
- Agricultural or Forestry Tractors and Tractor Components (Type Approval) (Amendment) Regulations 1992 (S.I. 1992/80)
- National Health Service (Indicative Amounts) (Scotland) Regulations 1992 (S.I. 1992/81)
- Act of Sederunt (Fees of Sheriff Officers) 1992 (S.I. 1992/82)
- Agricultural or Forestry Tractors and Tractor Components (Type Approval) (Fees) Regulations 1992 (S.I. 1992/83)
- Act of Sederunt (Fees of Messengers-at-Arms) 1992 (S.I. 1992/87)
- Act of Sederunt (Rules of the Court of Session Amendment) (Optional Procedure and Miscellaneous) 1992 (S.I. 1992/88)
- Revenue Support Grant (Specified Bodies) Regulations 1992 (S.I. 1992/89)
- Gaming Act (Variation of Fees) Order 1992 (S.I. 1992/93)
- Lotteries (Gaming Board Fees) Order 1992 (S.I. 1992/94)
- Community Charges and Non-Domestic Rating (Demand Notices) (Wales) (Amendment) Regulations 1992 (S.I. 1992/96)
- Social Security (Contributions) Amendment Regulations 1992 (S.I. 1992/97)
- Merchant Shipping (Prevention of Oil Pollution) (Amendment) Regulations 1992 (S.I. 1992/98)
- Registration of Births, Deaths and Marriages (Fees) Order 1992 (S.I. 1992/99)

== 101–200 ==
- Relevant Population (England) (Amendment) Regulations 1992 (S.I. 1992/108)
- Food Protection (Emergency Prohibitions) (Paralytic Shellfish Poisoning) (No. 13 Partial Revocation) Order 1992 (S.I. 1992/109)
- Education (Financial Delegation for Primary Schools) (Amendment) Regulations 1992 (S.I. 1992/110)
- Food Protection (Emergency Prohibitions) (Paralytic Shellfish Poisoning) (No. 14 Revocation) Order 1992 (S.I. 1992/111)
- Food Safety Act 1990 (Consequential Modifications) (Local Enactments) Order 1992 S.I. 1992/117)
- National Health Service (District Health Authorities) Order 1992 (S.I. 1992/119)
- National Health Service (Determination of Districts) Order 1992 (S.I. 1992/120)
- A3 Trunk Road (Stoke Junction Improvement Guildford Detrunking) Order 1992 (S.I. 1992/121)
- Land Registration (Open Register) Rules 1991 S.I. 1992/122)
- Buying Agency Trading Fund (Variation) Order 1992 (S.I. 1992/123)
- Lee Valley Water Plc (Constitution and Regulation) Order 1992 (S.I. 1992/124)
- Rickmansworth Water Plc (Constitution and Regulation) Order1992 (S.I. 1992/125)
- Revenue Support Grant (Scotland) Order 1992 (S.I. 1992/127)
- Firemen's Pension Scheme Order 1992 (S.I. 1992/129)
- Sea Fishing (Days in Port) Regulations 1992 (S.I. 1992/130)
- Chester and Halton Community National Health Service Trust (Transfer of Trust Property) Order 1992 (S.I. 1992/131)
- Epsom Health Care National Health Service Trust (Transfer of Trust Property) Order 1992 (S.I. 1992/132)
- North Middlesex Hospital National Health Service Trust (Transfer of Trust Property) Order 1992 (S.I. 1992/133)
- Royal London Hospital and Associated Community Services National Health Service Trust (Transfer of Trust Property) Order 1992 (S.I. 1992/134)
- Merchant Shipping (Cargo Ship Construction and Survey) Regulations 1984 (Amendment) Regulations 1992 (S.I. 1992/135)
- Education (National Curriculum) (Exceptions) Regulations 1992 (S.I. 1992/155)
- Education (National Curriculum) (Exceptions in History and Geography at Key Stage 4) Regulations 1992 (S.I. 1992/156)
- Education (National Curriculum) (Exceptions from Science at Key Stage 4) Regulations 1992 (S.I. 1992/157)
- Bovine Offal (Prohibition) (Scotland) Amendment Regulations 1992 (S.I. 1992/158)
- Education (Application of Financing Schemes to Special Schools) Regulations 1992 (S.I. 1992/164)
- Emulsifiers and Stabilisers in Food (Amendment) Regulations 1992 (S.I. 1992/165)
- Motor Vehicles (Driving Licences) (Large Goods and Passenger-Carrying Vehicles) (Amendment) Regulations 1992 (S.I. 1992/166)
- Food Protection (Emergency Prohibitions) (Paralytic Shellfish Poisoning) (No. 13 Revocation) Order 1992 (S.I. 1992/167)
- Lawnmowers (Harmonization of Noise Emission Standards) Regulations 1992 (S.I. 1992/168)
- The South Oxfordshire (Parishes) Order 1992 S.I. 1992/169
- Local Government Superannuation (Amendment) Regulations 1992 (S.I. 1992/172)
- Finance Act 1991, section 58, (Commencement No. 1) Regulations 1992 (S.I. 1992/173)
- A564 Trunk Road Stoke—Derby Route (Foston—Hatton—Hilton Bypass and Slip Roads) Order 1992 (S.I. 1992/174)
- A564 Trunk Road Stoke—Derby Route (Foston—Hatton—Hilton Bypass) (Detrunking) Order1992 (S.I. 1992/175)
- A564 Trunk Road (Stoke—Derby Route) (Derby Southern Bypass and Slip Roads) (No. 2) Order 1992 (S.I. 1992/176)
- A564 Trunk Road (Stoke—Derby Route) (Derby Southern Bypass, Derby Spur and Junctions) Order 1992 (S.I. 1992/177)
- A564 Trunk Road (Stoke—Derby Route) (Derby Southern Bypass) (Detrunking) (No.1) Order 1992 (S.I. 1992/178)
- A564 Trunk Road (Stoke — Derby Route) (Derby Southern Bypass and Slip Roads) (No 1) Order 1992 (S.I. 1992/179)
- A564 Trunk Road (Stoke — Derby Route) (Derby Southern Bypass) (Burnaston Slip Roads) Order 1992 (S.I. 1992/180)
- London—Carlisle—Glasgow—Inverness Trunk Road (Cavendish Bridge and Shardlow Diversion) Order 1938 (Revocation) Order 1992 (S.I. 1992/181)
- Fire Services (Appointments and Promotion) (Amendment) Regulations 1992 (S.I. 1992/187)
- City of London (Non-Domestic Rating Multiplier) Order 1992 (S.I. 1992/188)
- Sea Fishing (Enforcement of Community Quota Measures) Order 1992 (S.I. 1992/190)
- National Health Service (General Medical and Pharmaceutical Services) (Scotland) Amendment Regulations 1992 (S.I. 1992/191)
- Annual Close Time (River Findhorn Salmon Fishery District) Order 1992 (S.I. 1992/192)
- The Melton (Parishes) Order 1992 S.I. 1992/193
- Local Land Charges (Amendment) Rules 1992 (S.I. 1992/194)
- Lifting Plant and Equipment (Records of Test and Examination etc.) Regulations 1992 (S.I. 1992/195)
- Public Airport Companies (Capital Finance) (Second Amendment) Order 1992 (S.I. 1992/196)
- Stamp Duty and Stamp Duty Reserve Tax (Definition of Unit Trust Scheme) Regulations 1992 (S.I. 1992/197)
- Pensions Increase (Review) Order 1992 (S.I. 1992/198)
- Road Traffic Act 1991 (Commencement No. 2) Order 1992 (S.I. 1992/199)
- Disabled Persons (Badges for Motor Vehicles) (Amendment) Regulations 1992 (S.I. 1992/200)

== 201–300 ==
- Housing Benefit (General) Amendment Regulations 1992 (S.I. 1992/201)
- Medway Ports Authority Scheme 1991 Confirmation Order 1992 (S.I. 1992/202)
- Rate Support Grant (Scotland) Order 1991 S.I. 1992/207)
- Community Charges and Non-Domestic Rating (Demand Notices) (England) Regulations 1992 (S.I. 1992/208)
- Community Charges and Non-Domestic Rating (Demand Notices) (City of London) Regulations 1992 (S.I. 1992/209)
- Personal Community Charge (Relief) (Wales) Regulations 1992 (S.I. 1992/210)
- Copyright (Certification of Licensing Scheme for Educational Recording of Broadcasts and Cable Programmes) (Educational Recording Agency Limited) (Amendment) Order 1992 (S.I. 1992/211)
- Community Charges (Administration and Enforcement) (Amendment) Regulations 1992 (S.I. 1992/219)
- Town and Country Planning (General Permitted Development) (Scotland) Order 1992 (S.I. 1992/223)
- Town and Country Planning (General Development Procedure) (Scotland) Order 1992 (S.I. 1992/224)
- Uncertificated Securities Regulations 1992 (S.I. 1992/225)
- Cayman Islands (Constitution) (Amendment) Order 1992 (S.I. 1992/226)
- Child Abduction and Custody (Parties to Conventions) Order 1992 (S.I. 1992/227)
- Foreign Compensation (Financial Provisions) Order 1992 (S.I. 1992/228)
- Merchant Shipping (Confirmation of Legislation) (Cayman Islands) Order 1992 (S.I. 1992/229)
- Civil Aviation Act 1982 (Guernsey) Order 1992 (S.I. 1992/230)
- Electricity (Northern Ireland) Order 1992 (S.I. 1992/231)
- Electricity (Northern Ireland Consequential Amendments) Order 1992 (S.I. 1992/232)
- European Parliamentary Constituencies (England) (Miscellaneous Changes) Order 1992 (S.I. 1992/233)
- Radioactive Material (Road Transport) (Northern Ireland) Order 1992 (S.I. 1992/234)
- Tourism (Northern Ireland) Order 1992 (S.I. 1992/235)
- European Parliamentary Constituencies (Scotland) (Miscellaneous Changes) Order 1992 (S.I. 1992/236)
- International Transport Conventions Act 1983 (Amendment) Order 1992 (S.I. 1992/237)
- Diseases of Animals (Approved Disinfectants) (Amendment) Order1992 (S.I. 1992/238)
- Occupational Pension Schemes (Investment of Scheme's Resources) Regulations 1992 (S.I. 1992/246)
- Social Security (Miscellaneous Provisions) Amendment Regulations 1992 (S.I. 1992/247)
- Housing Support Grant (Scotland) Order 1992 (S.I. 1992/248)
- Act of Sederunt (Amendment of Ordinary Cause, Summary Cause and Small Claim Rules) 1992 (S.I. 1992/249)
- Sea Fishing (Enforcement of Community Conservation Measures) (Amendment) Order 1992 (S.I. 1992/263)
- River Tay Salmon Fishery District (Baits and Lures) Regulations 1992 (S.I. 1992/264)
- Taxes (Interest Rate) (Amendment) Regulations 1992 (S.I. 1992/265)
- Environmental Protection Act 1990 (Commencement No. 11) Order 1992 (S.I. 1992/266)
- Hill Livestock (Compensatory Allowances) Regulations 1992 (S.I. 1992/269)
- Suckler Cow Premium (Amendment) Regulations 1992 (S.I. 1992/270)
- Land Compensation (Additional Development) (Forms) Regulations 1992 (S.I. 1992/271)
- Act of Sederunt (Judicial Factors Rules) 1992 (S.I. 1992/272)
- Financial Services Act 1986 (Extension of Scope of Act) Order 1992 (S.I. 1992/273)
- Financial Services Act 1986 (Investment Advertisements) (Exemptions) Order 1992 (S.I. 1992/274)
- Police (Amendment) Regulations 1992 (S.I. 1992/275)
- Police Cadets (Amendment) Regulations 1992 (S.I. 1992/276)
- Teachers' Superannuation (Scotland) Regulations 1992 (S.I. 1992/280)
- Broadcasting (Investment Limit in Nominated Company) Order 1992 (S.I. 1992/281)
- Borough of Basingstoke and Deane (Electoral Arrangements) Order 1992 (S.I. 1992/282)
- Customs Duties (ECSC) (Quota and other Reliefs) (Amendment) Order 1992 (S.I. 1992/283)
- Port of Tilbury Transfer Scheme 1991 Confirmation Order 1992 (S.I. 1992/284)
- A428 Trunk Road (Bedford Southern Bypass) Order 1992 (S.I. 1992/285)
- Community Charges and Non-Domestic Rating (Miscellaneous Provisions) (England) (Amendment) Regulations 1992 (S.I. 1992/286)
- Local Government Finance (Additional Grant) (England) Regulations 1992 (S.I. 1992/287)
- Environmental Protection (Stray Dogs) Regulations 1992 (S.I. 1992/288)
- Social Security Benefit (Computation of Earnings) Amendment Regulations 1992 (S.I. 1992/300)

== 301–400 ==
- Environmentally Sensitive Areas (Pennine Dales) Designation (Amendment) Order 1992 (S.I. 1992/301)
- Local Authorities (Capital Finance) (Rate of Discount for 1992/93) Regulations 1992 (S.I. 1992/302)
- Gipsy Encampments (City of Cambridge) Order 1992 (S.I. 1992/303)
- Clyde Port Authority Scheme 1991 Confirmation Order 1992 (S.I. 1992/304)
- Lyon Court and Office Fees (Variation) Order 1992 (S.I. 1992/305)
- Bovine Offal (Prohibition) (Amendment) Regulations 1992 (S.I. 1992/306)
- British Railways (Penalty Fares) Act 1989 (Activating No.3) Order 1992 (S.I. 1992/307)
- Employment Protection (Variation of Limits) Order 1992 (S.I. 1992/312)
- Unfair Dismissal (Increase of Limits of Basic and Special Awards) Order 1992 (S.I. 1992/313)
- Common Agricultural Policy (Protection of Community Arrangements) Regulations 1992 (S.I. 1992/314)
- Misuse of Drugs (Licence Fees) (Amendment) Regulations 1992 (S.I. 1992/315)
- Price Indications (Bureaux de Change) Regulations 1992 (S.I. 1992/316)
- Pensions (Polish Forces) Scheme (Extension) Order 1992 (S.I. 1992/317)
- Social Security (Contributions) Amendment (No. 2) Regulations 1992 (S.I. 1992/318)
- Workmen's Compensation (Supplementation) Amendment Scheme 1992 (S.I. 1992/319)
- Wildlife and Countryside Act 1981 (Variation of Schedule) Order1992 (S.I. 1992/320)
- Costs in Criminal Cases (General) (Amendment) Regulations 1992 (S.I. 1992/323)
- Housing Act 1988 (Commencement No. 6) Order 1992 (S.I. 1992/324)
- Housing (Preservation of Right to Buy) (Scotland) Regulations 1992 (S.I. 1992/325)
- Education (London Residuary Body) (Transfer of Compensation Functions) Order 1992 (S.I. 1992/331)
- Children and Young Persons (Protection from Tobacco) Act 1991 (Commencement No. 2) Order 1992 (S.I. 1992/332)
- Criminal Justice Act 1991 (Commencement No. 3) Order 1992 (S.I. 1992/333)
- Planning and Compensation Act 1991 (Commencement No. 7 and Transitional Provisions) Order 1992 (S.I. 1992/334)
- Petty Sessional Divisions (Gwynedd) Order 1992 (S.I. 1992/335)
- Combined Probation Areas (North Wales) Order 1992 (S.I. 1992/336)
- Surface Waters (Dangerous Substances) (Classification) Regulations 1992 (S.I. 1992/337)
- National Health Service Trusts (Originating Capital Debt) Order 1992 (S.I. 1992/338)
- Trade Effluents (Prescribed Processes and Substances) Regulations 1992 (S.I. 1992/339)
- Fixed Penalty Offences Order 1992 (S.I. 1992/345)
- Fixed Penalty order 1992 (S.I. 1992/346)
- Protection of Wrecks (Designation No. 1) Order 1992 (S.I. 1992/347)
- Inner London Probation Area Order 1992 (S.I. 1992/348)
- Probation (Amendment) Rules 1992 (S.I. 1992/349)
- City of Swansea (Electoral Arrangements) Order 1992 (S.I. 1992/350)
- Road Vehicles (Construction and Use) (Amendment) Regulations 1992 (S.I. 1992/352)
- Wireless Telegraphy (Television Licence Fees) (Amendment) Regulations 1992 (S.I. 1992/353)
- New Town (Glenrothes) Winding Up Order 1992 (S.I. 1992/354)
- New Town (East Kilbride) Winding Up Order 1992 (S.I. 1992/355)
- Central Regional Council (Gartmorn Reservoir) Byelaws Extension Order 1992 (S.I. 1992/356)
- Mental Health (Detention) (Scotland) Act 1991 (Commencement) Order 1992 (S.I. 1992/357)
- Personal Community Charge (Reduction for 1992–93) (Scotland) Regulations 1992 (S.I. 1992/358)
- Building Societies (Accounts and Related Provisions) Regulations 1992 (S.I. 1992/359)
- Superannuation (Children's Pensions) (Earnings Limit) Order 1992 (S.I. 1992/360)
- Merchant Shipping (Load Lines) Act 1967 (Unregistered Ships) (Amendment) Order 1992 (S.I. 1992/361)
- Wireless Telegraphy (Licence Charges) (Amendment) Regulations 1992 (S.I. 1992/362)
- British Transport Police Force Scheme 1963 (Amendment) Order 1992 (S.I. 1992/364)
- National Health Service (Charges for Drugs and Appliances) Amendment Regulations 1992 (S.I. 1992/365)
- National Health Service (District Health Authorities) (No. 2) Order 1992 (S.I. 1992/366)
- National Health Service (Determination of Districts) (No. 2) Order 1992 (S.I. 1992/367)
- Regional and District Health Authorities (Membership and Procedure) Amendment Regulations 1992 (S.I. 1992/368)
- National Health Service (Dental Charges) Amendment Regulations 1992 (S.I. 1992/369)
- A41 Trunk Road (Brentfield Gardens, Barnet) (Prohibition of Right Turn) Order 1992 (S.I. 1992/370)
- Legal Aid (Scotland) (Fees in Civil Proceedings) Amendment Regulations 1992 (S.I. 1992/371)
- Civil Legal Aid (Scotland) (Fees) Amendment Regulations 1992 (S.I. 1992/372)
- Advice and Assistance (Scotland) Amendment Regulations 1992 (S.I. 1992/373)
- Criminal Legal Aid (Scotland) (Fees) Amendment Regulations 1992 (S.I. 1992/374)
- Recreation Grounds (Revocation of Parish Council Byelaws) Order 1992 (S.I. 1992/384)
- Removal, Storage and Disposal of Vehicles (Prescribed Sums and Charges, etc.) (Amendment) Regulations 1992 (S.I. 1992/385)
- Vehicles (Charges for Release from Immobilisation Devices) Regulations 1992 (S.I. 1992/386)
- Mid Cheshire Hospitals National Health Service Trust (Transfer of Trust Property) Order 1992 (S.I. 1992/387)
- West Dorset Community Health National Health Service Trust (Transfer of Trust Property) Order 1992 (S.I. 1992/388)
- West Dorset General Hospitals National Health Service Trust (Transfer of Trust Property) Order 1992 (S.I. 1992/389)
- West Dorset Mental Health National Health Service Trust (Transfer of Trust Property) Order 1992 (S.I. 1992/390)
- Grampian Regional Council (Spey Abstraction Scheme) Water Order 1992 (S.I. 1992/393)
- National Health Service (Charges for Drugs and Appliances) (Scotland) Amendment Regulations 1992 (S.I. 1992/394)
- Water (Prevention of Pollution) (Code of Practice) (Scotland) Order 1992 (S.I. 1992/395)
- Passenger Transport Executives (Capital Finance) (Amendment) Order 1992 (S.I. 1992/396)
- African Development Fund (Sixth Replenishment) Order 1992 (S.I. 1992/398)
- Caribbean Development Bank (Further Payments) Order 1992 (S.I. 1992/399)
- Design Right (Semiconductor Topographies) (Amendment) Regulations 1992 (S.I. 1992/400)

== 401–500 ==
- Scottish Land Court (Fees) Order 1992 (S.I. 1992/401)
- Lands Tribunal for Scotland (Amendment) (Fees) Rules 1992 (S.I. 1992/402)
- Pneumoconiosis etc. (Workers' Compensation) (Payment of Claims) (Amendment) Regulations 1992 (S.I. 1992/403)
- National Health Service (Optical Charges and Payments) (Miscellaneous Amendments) Regulations 1992 (S.I. 1992/404)
- Sugar Beet (Research and Education) Order 1992 (S.I. 1992/405)
- Litter (Statutory Undertakers) (Designation and Relevant Land) (Amendment) Order 1992 (S.I. 1992/406)
- Fire Services (Appointments and Promotion) (Scotland) Amendment Regulations 1992 (S.I. 1992/409)
- Gaming Act (Variation of Fees) (Scotland) Order 1992 (S.I. 1992/410)
- National Health Service (Charges to Overseas Visitors) (Scotland) Amendment Regulations 1992 (S.I. 1992/411)
- High Court of Justiciary Fees Amendment Order 1992 (S.I. 1992/412)
- Sheriff Court Fees Amendment Order 1992 (S.I. 1992/413)
- Court of Session etc. Fees Amendment Order 1992 (S.I. 1992/414)
- Road Traffic Act 1991 (Commencement No. 3) Order 1992 (S.I. 1992/421)
- Road Vehicles (Construction and Use) (Amendment) (No. 2) Regulations 1992 (S.I. 1992/422)
- Education (Mandatory Awards) (Amendment) Regulations 1992 (S.I. 1992/423)
- Colne Valley Water Company Plc (Constitution and Regulation) Order 1992 (S.I. 1992/424)
- Amusements with Prizes (Variation of Monetary Limits) Order 1992 (S.I. 1992/425)
- Gaming Act (Variation of Monetary Limits) Order 1992 (S.I. 1992/426)
- Education (Universities Funding Council) (Supplementary Functions) Order 1992 (S.I. 1992/427)
- Education (Polytechnics and Colleges Funding Council) (Supplementary Functions) Order 1992 (S.I. 1992/428)
- Gaming Act (Variation of Monetary Limits) (No.2) Order 1992 (S.I. 1992/429)
- Gaming (Bingo) Act (Fees) (Amendment) Order 1992 (S.I. 1992/430)
- Gaming Clubs (Hours and Charges) (Amendment) Regulations 1992 (S.I. 1992/431)
- Housing Benefit and Community Charge Benefits (Miscellaneous Amendments) Regulations 1992 (S.I. 1992/432)
- Erskine Bridge Tolls Order 1992 (SI 1992/433)
- National Health Service (Service Committees and Tribunal) (Scotland) Regulations 1992 (S.I. 1992/434)
- Fixed Penalty (Increase) (Scotland) Order 1992 (S.I. 1992/435)
- Seeds (National Lists of Varieties) (Fees) (Amendment) Regulations 1992 (S.I. 1992/436)
- Education (London Residuary Body) (Transfer of Functions and Property) Order 1992 (S.I. 1992/437)
- Plant Breeders' Rights (Fees) (Amendment) Regulations 1992 (S.I. 1992/438)
- Insurance Companies (Amendment)Regulations 1992 (S.I. 1992/445)
- Housing Defects (Expenditure Limits) Order 1992 (S.I. 1992/446)
- Community Charges (Notices) (Substitute Charges) (England) Regulations 1992 (S.I. 1992/448)
- Pipe-lines (Metrication) Regulations 1992 (S.I. 1992/449)
- Gas (Metrication) Regulations 1992 (S.I. 1992/450)
- Insider Dealing (Recognised Stock Exchange) Order 1992 (S.I. 1992/451)
- A4 Trunk Road (Bristol City Boundary to East of Hicks Gate Roundabout) (Detrunking) Order 1992 (S.I. 1992/452)
- Diseases of Animals (Waste Food) (Fees for Licences) Order 1992 (S.I. 1992/453)
- Plant Breeders' Rights (Potatoes) (Variation) Scheme 1992 (S.I. 1992/454)
- Maintenance Enforcement Act 1991 (Commencement No. 2) Order 1992 (S.I. 1992/455)
- Family Proceedings (Amendment) Rules 1992 (S.I. 1992/456)
- Magistrates' Courts (Maintenance Enforcement Act 1991) (Miscellaneous Amendments) Rules 1992 (S.I. 1992/457)
- National Health Service (Dental Charges) (Scotland) Amendment Regulations 1992 (S.I. 1992/458)
- A23 Trunk Road (Brighton Road, Croydon) (Box Junction) Order 1992 (S.I. 1992/459)
- HIV Testing Kits and Services Regulations 1992 (S.I. 1992/460)
- Certification Officer (Amendment of Fees) Regulations 1992 (S.I. 1992/461)
- Environmental Protection (Waste Recycling Payments) Regulations 1992 (S.I. 1992/462)
- Copyright Tribunal (Amendment) Rules 1992 (S.I. 1992/467)
- Income Support (General) Amendment Regulations 1992 (S.I. 1992/468)
- Social Security Benefits Up-rating Regulations 1992 (S.I. 1992/469)
- Social Security (Invalid Care Allowance) Amendment Regulations 1992 (S.I. 1992/470)
- Vehicle Inspectorate Trading Fund (Variation) Order 1992 (S.I. 1992/471)
- Merchant Shipping (Light Dues) (Amendment) Regulations 1992 (S.I. 1992/472)
- Local Government Finance Act 1992 (Commencement No. 1) Order 1992 (S.I. 1992/473)
- Community Charges and Non-Domestic Rating (Miscellaneous Provisions) Regulations 1992 (S.I. 1992/474)
- Civil Aviation (Navigation Services Charges) (Amendment) Regulations 1992 (S.I. 1992/475)
- Employment Code of Practice (Picketing) Order 1992 (S.I. 1992/476)
- Town and Country Planning (Enforcement of Control) (Scotland) Regulations 1992 (S.I. 1992/477)
- Town and Country Planning (Special Enforcement Notices) (Scotland) Regulations 1992 (S.I. 1992/478)
- Home Energy Efficiency Grants Regulations 1992 (S.I. 1992/483)
- Wireless Telegraphy Apparatus (Low Power Devices) (Exemption)(Amendment) Regulations 1992 (S.I. 1992/484)
- Construction Plant and Equipment (Harmonisation of Noise Emission Standards) (Amendment) Regulations 1992 (S.I. 1992/488)
- Motor Vehicles (Type Approval and Approval Marks) (Fees) Regulations 1992 (S.I. 1992/489)
- Harrogate Health Care National Health Service Trust (Transfer of Trust Property) Order 1992 (S.I. 1992/492)
- Norfolk Ambulance National Health Service Trust (Transfer of Trust Property) Order 1992 (S.I. 1992/493)
- Personal Community Charge (Exemption for the Severely Mentally Impaired) Order 1992 (S.I. 1992/494)
- Prevention of Terrorism (Temporary Provisions) Act 1989 (Continuance) Order 1992 (S.I. 1992/495)
- Tin in Food Regulations 1992 (S.I. 1992/496)
- Building Societies (General Charge and Fees) Regulations 1992 (S.I. 1992/497)
- Friendly Societies (Fees) Regulations 1992 (S.I. 1992/498)
- Industrial and Provident Societies (Amendment of Fees) Regulations 1992 (S.I. 1992/499)
- Industrial and Provident Societies (Credit Unions) (Amendment of Fees) Regulations 1992 (S.I. 1992/500)

== 501–600 ==
- Education (London Residuary Body) (Transfer of Loans) Order 1992 (S.I. 1992/501)
- Local Authorities (Capital Finance) (Amendment) Regulations 1992 (S.I. 1992/502)
- Personal Community Charge (Exemption for the Severely Mentally Impaired) (Scotland) Regulations 1992 (S.I. 1992/503)
- Crofter Forestry (Scotland) Act 1991 (Commencement) Order 1992 (S.I. 1992/504)
- Local Authorities Etc. (Allowances) (Scotland) Amendment Regulations 1992 (S.I. 1992/505)
- M40 (London–Oxford) Motorway (Stokenchurch to Waterstock Crossroads Section) Scheme 1970, Variation Scheme 1992 (S.I. 1992/506)
- Industrial Assurance (Fees) Regulations 1992 (S.I. 1992/508)
- Building Societies (Provision of Services) Order 1992 (S.I. 1992/509)
- Retention of Registration Marks Regulations 1992 (S.I. 1992/510)
- Lloyd's Underwriters (Tax) (1989—90) Regulations1992 (S.I. 1992/511)
- Registered Housing Associations (Accounting Requirements) Order 1992 (S.I. 1992/512)
- Young Offender Institution (Amendment) Rules 1992 (S.I. 1992/513)
- Prison (Amendment) Rules 1992 (S.I. 1992/514)
- Assured and Protected Tenancies (Lettings to Students) (Amendment) Regulations 1992 (S.I. 1992/515)
- Insurance (Fees) Regulations 1992 (S.I. 1992/516)
- Norfolk and Suffolk Broads (Extension of Byelaws) Order 1992 (S.I. 1992/517)
- Submarine Pipe-lines (Designated Owners) Order 1992 (S.I. 1992/518)
- Submarine Pipe-lines (Designated Owners) (No. 2) Order 1992 (S.I. 1992/519)
- Submarine Pipe-lines (Designated Owners) (No. 3) Order 1992 (S.I. 1992/520)
- Submarine Pipe-lines (Designated Owners) (No. 4) Order 1992 (S.I. 1992/521)
- Submarine Pipe-lines (Designated Owners) (No. 5) Order 1992 (S.I. 1992/522)
- North Tees Health National Health Service Trust (Transfer of Trust Property) Order 1992 (S.I. 1992/523)
- Social Security (Industrial Injuries) (Dependency) (Permitted Earnings Limits) Order 1992 (S.I. 1992/524)
- Milton Keynes Development Corporation (Transfer of Property and Dissolution) Order 1992 (S.I. 1992/525)
- City of Edinburgh and Midlothian Districts (Edinburgh City By-pass) Boundaries Amendment Order 1992 (S.I. 1992/526) (S. 57)
- Criminal Legal Aid (Scotland) Amendment Regulations 1992 (S.I. 1992/527)
- Advice and Assistance (Scotland) (Prospective Cost) Amendment Regulations 1992 (S.I. 1992/528)
- Act of Sederunt (Fees of Messengers-at-Arms) (Amendment) 1992 (S.I. 1992/529)
- Environmental Protection (Determination of Enforcing Authority Etc.) (Scotland) Regulations 1992 (S.I. 1992/530)
- National Health Service (Optical Charges and Payments) (Miscellaneous Amendments) (Scotland) Regulations 1992 (S.I. 1992/531)
- School Teachers' Pay and Conditions Act 1991 (Commencement No. 2 and Transitional Provision) Order 1992 (S.I. 1992/532)
- M1 London-Yorkshire Motorway (Widening Junction 9 to 10 Northbound) Connecting Roads Scheme 1992 (S.I. 1992/534)
- A249 Iwade Bypass Order 1992 (S.I. 1992/535)
- A249 Iwade Bypass (Detrunking) Order 1992 (S.I. 1992/536)
- A249 Iwade Bypass (Slip Roads) Order 1992 (S.I. 1992/537)
- Motor Vehicles (Driving Licences) (Large Goods and Passenger-Carrying Vehicles) (Amendment) (No. 2) Regulations 1992 (S.I. 1992/538)
- Motor Vehicles (Driving Licences) (Amendment) Regulations 1992 (S.I. 1992/539)
- Local Authorities (Members' Allowances) (Amendment) Regulations 1992 (S.I. 1992/540)
- Weston Area National Health Service Trust (Transfer of Trust Property) Order 1992 (S.I. 1992/541)
- Housing (Change of Landlord) (Payment of Disposal Cost by Instalments) (Amendment) Regulations 1992 (S.I. 1992/542)
- Forth Ports Authority Scheme 1992 Confirmation Order 1992 (S.I. 1992/546)
- Export of Goods (Control) (Amendment) Order 1992 (S.I. 1992/547)
- Council Tax (Discount Disregards) Order 1992 (S.I. 1992/548)
- Council Tax (Chargeable Dwellings) Order 1992 (S.I. 1992/549)
- Council Tax (Situation and Valuation of Dwellings) Regulations 1992 (S.I. 1992/550)
- Council Tax (Liability for Owners) Regulations 1992 (S.I. 1992/551)
- Council Tax (Additional Provisions for Discount Disregards) Regulations 1992 (S.I. 1992/552)
- Council Tax (Contents of Valuation Lists) Regulations 1992 (S.I. 1992/553)
- Council Tax (Reductions for Disabilities) Regulations 1992 (S.I. 1992/554)
- Education (Grant-maintained Schools) (Finance) Regulations 1992 (S.I. 1992/555)
- Non-Domestic Rating (Material Day for List Alterations) Regulations 1992 (S.I. 1992/556)
- Non-Domestic Rating (Multiple Moorings) Regulations 1992 (S.I. 1992/557)
- Council Tax (Exempt Dwellings) Order 1992 (S.I. 1992/558)
- Non-Domestic Rating (Transitional Period) (Further Provision) Regulations 1992 (S.I. 1992/559)
- Royal Liverpool Children's Hospital and Community Services National Health Service Trust (Transfer of Trust Property) Order 1992 (S.I. 1992/560)
- United Bristol Healthcare National Health Service Trust (Transfer of Trust Property) Order 1992 (S.I. 1992/561)
- Housing Renovation etc. Grants (Prescribed Forms and Particulars) (Amendment) Regulations 1992 (S.I. 1992/562)
- National Assistance (Charges for Accommodation) Regulations 1992 (S.I. 1992/563)
- Goods Vehicles (Plating and Testing) (Amendment) Regulations 1992 (S.I. 1992/564)
- Public Service Vehicles (Conditions of Fitness, Equipment, Use and Certification) (Amendment) Regulations 1992 (S.I. 1992/565)
- Motor Vehicles (Tests) (Amendment) Regulations 1992 (S.I. 1992/566)
- National Health Service and Community Care Act 1990 (Commencement No. 9) Order 1992 (S.I. 1992/567)
- Income Tax (Dealers in Securities) Regulations 1992 (S.I. 1992/568)
- Income Tax (Dividend Manufacturing) Regulations 1992 S.I. 1992/569)
- Stamp Duty and Stamp Duty Reserve Tax (Investment Exchanges and Clearing Houses) Regulations 1992 (S.I. 1992/570)
- Income Tax (Definition of Unit Trust Scheme) (Amendment) Regulations 1992 (S.I. 1992/571)
- Income Tax (Stock Lending) (Amendment) Regulations 1992 (S.I. 1992/572)
- Family Credit (General) Amendment Regulations 1992 (S.I. 1992/573)
- Surface Waters (Dangerous Substances) (Classification) (Scotland) Regulations 1992 (S.I. 1992/574)
- Private Water Supplies (Scotland) Regulations 1992 (S.I. 1992/575)
- South Eastern Police (Amalgamation) Amendment (No.2) Scheme Order 1992 (S.I. 1992/576)
- Severn Bridges Tolls Order 1992 (S.I. 1992/577)
- Severn Bridges Act 1992 (Appointed Day) Order 1992 (S.I. 1992/578)
- Severn Bridges (Designation of Staff for Transfer) Order 1992 (S.I. 1992/579)
- Nursing and Midwifery Student Allowances (Scotland) Regulations 1992 (S.I. 1992/580)
- Waltham Forest Housing Action Trust (Transfer of Property) Order 1992 (S.I. 1992/581)
- Local Government (Direct Labour Organisations) (Competition) (Exemption) (England) Regulations 1992 (S.I. 1992/582)
- Local Government Act 1988 (Defined Activities) (Exemption) (England) Order 1992 (S.I. 1992/583)
- Birmingham Heartlands Development Corporation (Area and Constitution) Order 1992 Approved by both Houses of Parliament S.I. 1992/584)
- Social Security (Invalidity Benefit and Severe Disablement Allowance) Miscellaneous Amendment Regulations 1992 (S.I. 1992/585)
- Education (London Residuary Body) (Transitional and Supplementary Provisions) Order 1992 (S.I. 1992/586)
- Education (London Residuary Body) (Property Transfer) Order1992 (S.I. 1992/587)
- Controlled Waste Regulations 1992 (S.I. 1992/588)
- Social Security (Overlapping Benefits) Amendment Regulations 1992 (S.I. 1992/589)
- Civil Legal Aid (General) (Amendment) Regulations 1992 (S.I. 1992/590)
- Legal Advice and Assistance (Amendment) Regulations 1992 (S.I. 1992/591)
- Legal Aid in Criminal and Care Proceedings (Costs) (Amendment) Regulations 1992 (S.I. 1992/592)
- Civil Courts (Amendment) Order 1992 (S.I. 1992/593)
- Legal Advice and Assistance at Police Stations (Remuneration) (Amendment) Regulations 1992 (S.I. 1992/594)
- Legal Aid in Contempt Proceedings (Remuneration) (Amendment) Regulations 1992 (S.I. 1992/595)
- Legal Aid in Family Proceedings (Remuneration) (Amendment) Regulations 1992 (S.I. 1992/596)
- Education (National Curriculum) (Attainment Targets and Programmes of Study in Music) (England) Order 1992 (S.I. 1992/597)
- Education (National Curriculum) (Attainment Targets and Programmes of Study in Art) (England) Order 1992 (S.I. 1992/598)
- Parliamentary Pensions (Amendment) Regulations 1992 (S.I. 1992/599)
- Parliamentary Contributory Pension Fund (Exchequer Contribution) Regulations 1992 (S.I. 1992/600) by the pension of exc 1900/98

== 601–700 ==
- Northallerton Health Services National Health Service Trust (Transfer of Trust Property) Order 1992 (S.I. 1992/601)
- County Council of Avon (Avon Valley Bridge) Scheme 1989 Confirmation Instrument 1992 (S.I. 1992/602)
- Education (National Curriculum) (Attainment Target and Programmes of Study in Physical Education) Order 1992 (S.I. 1992/603)
- Medicines Act 1968 (Amendment) Regulations 1992 (S.I. 1992/604)
- Medicines Act 1968 (Application to Radiopharmaceutical-associated Products) Regulations 1992 (S.I. 1992/605)
- Medicines (Committee on the Review of Medicines) (Revocation) Order 1992 (S.I. 1992/606)
- Safety of Sports Grounds (Designation) Order 1992 (S.I. 1992/607)
- Diving Operations at Work (Amendment) Regulations 1992 (S.I. 1992/608)
- Town and Country Planning General Development (Amendment) Order 1992 (S.I. 1992/609)
- Town and Country Planning (Use Classes) (Amendment) Order 1992 (S.I. 1992/610)
- Non-Domestic Rating (Alteration of Lists and Appeals) (Amendment) Regulations 1992 (S.I. 1992/611)
- Local Authorities (Calculation of Council Tax Base) Regulations 1992 (S.I. 1992/612)
- Council Tax (Administration and Enforcement) Regulations 1992 (S.I. 1992/613)
- Environmental Protection (Prescribed Processes and Substances) (Amendment) Regulations 1992 (S.I. 1992/614)
- Design Right (Proceedings before Comptroller) (Amendment) Rules 1992 (S.I. 1992/615)
- Patents (Fees) Rules 1992 (S.I. 1992/616)
- Registered Designs (Fees) Rules 1992 (S.I. 1992/617)
- Local Authorities (Members' Interests) Regulations 1992 (S.I. 1992/618)
- Race Relations Code of Practice (Non-Rented Housing) Order 1992 (S.I. 1992/619)
- Collection Fund (England) (Amendment) Regulations 1992 (S.I. 1992/620)
- Birmingham Heartlands Development Corporation (Planning Functions) Order 1992 (S.I. 1992/621)
- Income Tax (Indexation) Order 1992 (S.I. 1992/622)
- Personal Equity Plan (Amendment) Regulations 1992 (S.I. 1992/623)
- Retirement Benefits Schemes (Indexation of Earnings Cap) Order 1992 (S.I. 1992/624)
- Inheritance Tax (Indexation) Order 1992 (S.I. 1992/625)
- Capital Gains Tax (Annual Exempt Amount) Order 1992 (S.I. 1992/626)
- Value Added Tax (Cars) (Amendment) Order 1992 (S.I. 1992/627)
- Value Added Tax (Charities and Aids for Handicapped Persons) Order 1992 (S.I. 1992/628)
- Value Added Tax (Increase of Registration Limits) Order 1992 (S.I. 1992/629)
- Value Added Tax (Treatment of Transactions) Order 1992 (S.I. 1992/630)
- Telecommunications Act 1984 (Government Shareholding) Order 1992 (S.I. 1992/631)
- Social Security Act 1990 (Commencement No.4) Order 1992 (S.I. 1992/632)
- Social Security (Disability Living Allowance) Amendment Regulations 1992 (S.I. 1992/633)
- Motor Vehicles (Designation of Approval Marks) (Amendment) Regulations 1992 (S.I. 1992/634)
- National Health Service (General Medical Services) Regulations 1992 (S.I. 1992/635)
- National Health Service (Fund-holding Practices) (Amendment) Regulations 1992 (S.I. 1992/636)
- Welfare Food Amendment Regulations 1992 (S.I. 1992/637)
- Rules of the Supreme Court (Amendment) 1992 (S.I. 1992/638)
- Legal Advice and Assistance (Duty Solicitor) (Remuneration) (Amendment) Regulations 1992 (S.I. 1992/639)
- Fire Service College Trading Fund Order 1992 (S.I. 1992/640)
- National Health Service (General Dental Services) (Scotland) Amendment Regulations 1992 (S.I. 1992/641)
- Non-Domestic Rates (Levying) (Scotland) Regulations 1992 (S.I. 1992/642)
- Non-Domestic Rates (No. 2) (Scotland) Regulations 1992 (S.I. 1992/643)
- Value Added Tax (Cash Accounting) (Amendment) Regulations 1992 (S.I. 1992/644)
- Value Added Tax (General) (Amendment) Regulations 1992 (S.I. 1992/645)
- Road Vehicles (Construction and Use) (Amendment) (No. 3) Regulations 1992 (S.I. 1992/646)
- Radioactive Substances (Substances of Low Activity) Exemption (Amendment) Order 1992 (S.I. 1992/647)
- Building Societies (Designation of Qualifying Bodies) Order 1992 (S.I. 1992/649)
- Building Societies (Designation of Qualifying Bodies) (No. 2) Order 1992 (S.I. 1992/650)
- Building Societies (Designation of Qualifying Bodies) (No. 3) Order 1992 (S.I. 1992/651)
- Building Societies (Designation of Qualifying Bodies) (No. 4) Order 1992 (S.I. 1992/652)
- Collection Fund (Wales) (Amendment) Regulations 1992 (S.I. 1992/653)
- Financial Assistance for Environmental Purposes (England and Wales) Order 1992 (S.I. 1992/654)
- Dental Practice Board Regulations 1992 (S.I. 1992/655)
- Planning (Hazardous Substances) Regulations 1992 (S.I. 1992/656)
- Town and Country Planning (Use Classes) (Amendment) (No. 2) Order 1992 (S.I. 1992/657)
- Town and Country Planning General Development (Amendment) (No. 2) Order 1992 (S.I. 1992/658)
- National Health Service Functions (Administration Arrangements and Amendment of Directions) Regulations 1992 (S.I. 1992/659)
- National Health Service (Appellate and Other Functions) Regulations 1992 (S.I. 1992/660)
- National Health Service (General Dental Services) Regulations 1992 (S.I. 1992/661)
- National Health Service (Pharmaceutical Services) Regulations 1992 (S.I. 1992/662)
- Community Charges (Administration and Enforcement) (Attachment of Earnings Order) (Wales) Regulations 1992 (S.I. 1992/663)
- National Health Service (Service Committees and Tribunal) Regulations 1992 (S.I. 1992/664)
- Planning and Compensation Act 1991 (Commencement No. 8) Order 1992 (S.I. 1992/665)
- Town and Country Planning (Control of Advertisements) Regulations 1992 (S.I. 1992/666)
- Social Security (Contributions) Amendment (No. 3) Regulations 1992 (S.I. 1992/667)
- Social Security (Contributions) Amendment (No. 4) Regulations 1992 (S.I. 1992/668)
- Social Security (Contributions) Amendment (No. 5) Regulations 1992 (S.I. 1992/669)
- Sea Fishing (Days in Port) (Amendment) Regulations 1992 (S.I. 1992/670)
- Artificial Insemination of Cattle (Animal Health) (England and Wales) (Amendment) Regulations 1992 (S.I. 1992/671)
- Common Agricultural Policy (Wine) Regulations 1992 (S.I. 1992/672)
- A38, A40 and A417 Trunk Roads (Gloucester City) (Detrunking) Order 1992 (S.I. 1992/673)
- A1 Trunk Road (Haringey) Red Route Experimental Traffic Order 1992 (S.I. 1992/685)
- A1 Trunk Road (Haringey) (Bus Lanes) Red Route Experimental Traffic Order 1992 (S.I. 1992/686)
- A1 Trunk Road (Islington) (Bus Lanes) Red Route Experimental Traffic Order 1992 (S.I. 1992/687)
- Burning of Crop Residues (Repeal of Byelaws) Order 1992 (S.I. 1992/693)
- Medicines (Fees Relating to Medicinal Products for Animal Use) Regulations 1992 (S.I. 1992/694)
- Oilseeds Producers (Support System) Regulations 1992 (S.I. 1992/695)
- Veterinary Surgery (Epidural Anaesthesia) Order 1992 (S.I. 1992/696)
- Levying Bodies (General) (Amendment) Regulations 1992 (S.I. 1992/697)
- Valuation for Rating (Former Enterprise Zones) (Amendment) Regulations 1992 (S.I. 1992/698)
- A1 Trunk Road (Islington) Red Route Experimental Traffic Order 1992 (S.I. 1992/699)
- National Assistance (Charges for Accommodation) (Scotland) Regulations 1992 (S.I. 1992/700)

== 701–800 ==
- Housing Benefit and Community Charge Benefit (Subsidy) Amendment Regulations 1992 (S.I. 1992/701)
- Personal Injuries (Civilians) Amendment Scheme 1992 (S.I. 1992/702)
- Social Security (Attendance Allowance) Amendment Regulations 1992 (S.I. 1992/703)
- Social Security (Severe Disablement Allowance) Amendment Regulations 1992 (S.I. 1992/704)
- Housing Renovation etc. Grants (Reduction of Grant) (Amendment) Regulations 1992 (S.I. 1992/705)
- Representation of the People (Variation of Limits of Candidates' Election Expenses) Order 1992 (S.I. 1992/706)
- European Communities (Designation) Order 1992 (S.I. 1992/707)
- Football Spectators (Corresponding Offences in Sweden) Order 1992 (S.I. 1992/708)
- Transfer of Functions (Magistrates' Courts and Family Law) Order 1992 (S.I. 1992/709)
- Naval, Military and Air Forces etc. (Disablement and Death) Service Pensions Amendment Order 1992 (S.I. 1992/710)
- Gas Appliances (Safety) Regulations 1992 (S.I. 1992/711)
- Telecommunication Meters (Approval Fees) (British Approvals Board for Telecommunications) Order 1992 (S.I. 1992/712)
- Passenger and Goods Vehicles (Recording Equipment) (Approval of Fitters and Workshops) (Fees) (Amendment) Regulations 1992 (S.I. 1992/713)
- International Carriage of Dangerous Goods by Road (Fees) (Amendment) Regulations 1992 (S.I. 1992/714)
- International Transport of Goods under Cover of TIR Carnets (Fees) (Amendment) Regulations 1992 (S.I. 1992/715)
- Financial Markets and Insolvency (Amendment) Regulations 1992 (S.I. 1992/716)
- Returning Officers' Charges Order 1992 (S.I. 1992/717)
- Civil Legal Aid (Assessment of Resources) (Amendment) Regulations 1992 (S.I. 1992/718)
- Legal Advice and Assistance (Amendment) (No. 2) Regulations 1992 (S.I. 1992/719)
- Legal Aid in Criminal and Care Proceedings (General) (Amendment) Regulations 1992 (S.I. 1992/720)
- Civil Legal Aid (General) (Amendment) (No. 2) Regulations 1992 (S.I. 1992/721)
- Representation of the People (Amendment) Regulations 1992 (S.I. 1992/722)
- European Parliamentary Elections (Amendment) Regulations 1992 (S.I. 1992/723)
- Public Trustee (Fees) (Amendment) Order 1992 (S.I. 1992/724)
- Planning (Hazardous Substances) Act 1990 (Commencement and Transitional Provisions) Order 1992 (S.I. 1992/725)
- Social Security (Credits) Amendment Regulations 1992 (S.I. 1992/726)
- Criminal Justice Act 1991 (Suspension of Prisoner Custody Officer Certificate) Regulations 1992 (S.I. 1992/727)
- Social Security (Introduction of Disability Living Allowance) Miscellaneous Amendments Regulations 1992 (S.I. 1992/728)
- Magistrates' Courts (Miscellaneous Amendments) Rules 1992 (S.I. 1992/729)
- Returning Officer's Charges (Northern Ireland) Order 1992 (S.I. 1992/730)
- Income Tax (Cash Equivalents of Car Benefits) Order 1992 (S.I. 1992/731)
- Income Tax (Cash Equivalents of Car Fuel Benefits) Order 1992 (S.I. 1992/732)
- Value Added Tax (Increase of Consideration for Fuel) Order 1992 (S.I. 1992/733)
- Vocational Training (Public Financial Assistance and Disentitlement to Tax Relief) Regulations 1992 (S.I. 1992/734)
- Education (Student Loans) (Amendment) Regulations 1992 (S.I. 1992/735)
- Pensions Increase (Judicial Pensions) (Amendment) Regulations 1992 (S.I. 1992/736)
- Price Indications (Bureaux de Change) (No.2) Regulations 1992 (S.I. 1992/737)
- Local Authorities (Capital Finance) (Amendment) Regulations 1992 (S.I. 1992/738)
- Housing Benefit and Community Charge Benefit (Subsidy) Order 1992 (S.I. 1992/739)
- Building (Approved Inspectors etc.) (Amendment) Regulations 1992 (S.I. 1992/740)
- Building (Prescribed Fees etc.) (Amendment) Regulations S.I. 1992/741)
- Road Traffic (Carriage of Dangerous Substances in Packages etc.) Regulations 1992 (S.I. 1992/742)
- Road Traffic (Carriage of Dangerous Substances in Road Tankers and Tank Containers) Regulations 1992 (S.I. 1992/743)
- Road Traffic (Training of Drivers of Vehicles Carrying Dangerous Goods) Regulations 1992 (S.I. 1992/744)
- Civil Jurisdiction and Judgments Act 1991 (Commencement) Order 1992 (S.I. 1992/745)
- Vocational Training (Tax Relief) Regulations 1992 (S.I. 1992/746)
- Motor Vehicles (Competitions and Trials) (Scotland) Amendment Regulations 1992 (S.I. 1992/747)
- Act of Sederunt (Fees of Solicitors in the Sheriff Court) (Amendment) 1992 (S.I. 1992/748)
- Amusements with Prizes (Variation of Monetary Limits) (Scotland) Order 1992 (S.I. 1992/749)
- Gaming Clubs (Hours and Charges) (Scotland) Amendment Regulations 1992 (S.I. 1992/750)
- Gaming Act (Variation of Monetary Limits) (Scotland) Order 1992 (S.I. 1992/751)
- Advice and Assistance (Scotland) Amendment (No.2) Regulations 1992 (S.I. 1992/752)
- Civil Legal Aid (Scotland) Amendment Regulations 1992 (S.I. 1992/753)
- National Health Service (Travelling Expenses and Remission of Charges) (Scotland) Amendment Regulations 1992 (S.I. 1992/754)
- Medicines (Applications for Grant and Renewal of Licences) (Miscellaneous Amendments) Regulations 1992 (S.I. 1992/755)
- Medicines (Products for Human Use– Fees) Amendment Regulations 1992 (S.I. 1992/756)
- Education (National Curriculum) (Attainment Targets and Programmes of Study in Art) (Wales) Order 1992 (S.I. 1992/757)
- Education (National Curriculum) (Attainment Targets and Programmes of Study in Music) (Wales) Order 1992 (S.I. 1992/758)
- Housing Renovation etc. Grants (Prescribed Forms and Particulars) (Welsh Forms and Particulars) (Amendment) Regulations 1992 (S.I. 1992/759)
- Local Government and Housing Act 1989 (Commencement No. 14) Order 1992 (S.I. 1992/760)
- Measuring Instruments (EEC Requirements) (Fees) (Amendment) Regulations 1992 (S.I. 1992/761)
- Aggravated Vehicle-Taking Act 1992 (Commencement) Order 1992 (S.I. 1992/764)
- Weights and Measures Act 1985 (Commencement) Order 1992 (S.I. 1992/770)
- Loch Awe and Associated Waters Protection Order 1992 (S.I. 1992/771)
- Highlands and Islands Rural Enterprise Programme (Amendment) Regulations 1992 (S.I. 1992/772)
- Act of Sederunt (Fees of Sheriff Officers) (Amendment) 1992 (S.I. 1992/773)
- Customs Duties (ECSC) (Amendment No. 7) Order 1992 (S.I. 1992/792)
- County Court (Amendment) Rules 1992 (S.I. 1992/793)
- County Court (Forms)(Amendment) Rules 1992 (S.I. 1992/794)
- Social Security (Class 1 Contributions – Contracted-out Percentages) Order 1992 (S.I. 1992/795)
- State Scheme Premiums (Actuarial Tables) Regulations 1992 (S.I. 1992/796)
- Statutory Sick Pay (Small Employers' Relief) Amendment Regulations 1992 (S.I. 1992/797)
- Act of Sederunt (Coal Mining Subsidence Act 1991) 1992 (S.I. 1992/798)
- National Health Service and Community Care Act 1990 (Commencement No. 3 and Transitional Provisions) (Scotland) (Amendment) Order 1992 (S.I. 1992/799)
- Foresterhill Hospitals National Health Service Trust (Establishment) Amendment Order 1992 (S.I. 1992/800)

== 801–900 ==
- South Ayrshire Hospitals National Health Service Trust (Establishment) Amendment Order 1992 (S.I. 1992/801)
- Admiralty Jurisdiction (British Indian Ocean Territory) (Amendment) Order 1992 (S.I. 1992/802)
- Child Abduction and Custody (Parties to Conventions) (Amendment) Order 1992 (S.I. 1992/803)
- Medical Qualifications (Amendment) Act 1991 (Commencement) Order 1992 (S.I. 1992/804)
- Appropriation (Northern Ireland) Order 1992 (S.I. 1992/805)
- Civil Aviation Act 1982 (Guernsey) (Amendment) Order 1992 (S.I. 1992/806)
- Industrial Relations (Northern Ireland) Order 1992 (S.I. 1992/807)
- Industrial Relations (Northern Ireland Consequential Amendment) Order 1992 (S.I. 1992/808)
- Local Elections (Northern Ireland) (Amendment) Order 1992 (S.I. 1992/809)
- Local Government (Miscellaneous Provisions) (Northern Ireland) Order 1992 (S.I. 1992/810)
- Registration (Land and Deeds) (Northern Ireland) Order 1992 (S.I. 1992/811)
- Social Security (Barbados) Order 1992 (S.I. 1992/812)
- Financial Services Act 1986 (Investment Advertisements) (Exemptions) (No. 2) Order 1992 (S.I. 1992/813)
- Education (School Teachers' Pay and Conditions) Order 1992 (S.I. 1992/814)
- Land Registration (Scotland) Act 1979 (Commencement No. 5) Order 1992 (S.I. 1992/815)
- Commonwealth Development Corporation (Raising of Limits on Borrowing and Advances) Order 1992 (S.I. 1992/816)
- Further and Higher Education (Scotland) Act 1992 (Commencement No.1 and Saving Provisions) Order 1992 (S.I. 1992/817)
- Local Government Finance Act 1992 (Commencement No. 2) Order 1992 (S.I. 1992/818)
- Licensing (Amendment) (Scotland) Act 1992 (Commencement and Savings) Order 1992 (S.I. 1992/819)
- Further and Higher Education Act 1992 (Commencement No. 1 and Transitional Provisions) Order 1992 (S.I. 1992/831)
- Representation of the People (Northern Ireland) (Amendment) Regulations 1992 (S.I. 1992/832)
- European Parliamentary Elections (Northern Ireland) (Amendment) Regulations 1992 (S.I. 1992/833)
- Representation of the People (Scotland) Amendment Regulations 1992 (S.I. 1992/834)
- Petty Sessional Divisions (Oxfordshire) Order 1992 (S.I. 1992/838)
- Petty Sessional Divisions (Essex) Order 1992 (S.I. 1992/839)
- Combined Probation Areas (Oxfordshire) Order 1992 (S.I. 1992/840)
- Combined Probation Areas (Essex) Order 1992 (S.I. 1992/841)
- Magistrates' Courts Fees (Amendment) Order 1992 (S.I. 1992/842)
- Food Protection (Emergency Prohibitions) (Dioxins) (England) Order 1992 (S.I. 1992/849)
- A12 Trunk Road (Eastern Avenue East and Eastern Avenue West, Havering) (Prescribed Routes) Order 1992 (S.I. 1992/858)
- A23 Trunk Road (Foxley Lane, Croydon) (Prohibition of Right Turn) Order 1992 (S.I. 1992/859)
- Industrial and Freight Transport (Rateable Values) (Scotland) Order 1992 (S.I. 1992/864)
- Mines and Quarries (Rateable Values) (Scotland) Order 1992 (S.I. 1992/865)
- Submarine Pipe-lines (Designated Owners) (No. 6) Order 1992 (S.I. 1992/890)
- Act of Sederunt (Rules of the Court of Session Amendment No.2) (Solicitors' Fees) 1992 (S.I. 1992/894)
- A16 Trunk Road (Great Grimsby Borough Boundary to Toll Bar Roundabout) (Detrunking) Order 1990 Amendment Order 1992 (S.I. 1992/895)
- Clackmannan District Council (Vesting of Central Regional Council Land) (Scotland) Order 1991 S.I. 1992/900)

== 901–1000 ==
- Control of Dogs Order 1992 (S.I. 1992/901)
- Palace of Westminster (Appointed Day) Order 1992 (S.I. 1992/902)
- Farm Woodland Premium Scheme 1992 (S.I. 1992/905)
- Combined Probation Areas (Leicestershire) Order 1992 (S.I. 1992/916)
- Dart Valley Light Railway Plc (Totnes and Ashburton) Light Railway (Transfer) Order 1992 (S.I. 1992/926)
- Community Charges and Non-Domestic Rating (Demand Notices) (Wales) (Amendment) (No. 2) Regulations 1992 (S.I. 1992/935)
- Common Agricultural Policy (Wine) (Amendment) Regulations 1992 (S.I. 1992/937)
- (A50) Nottingham–Derby–Stoke-on-Trent Trunk Road (Blythe Bridge to Queensway and Connecting Roads) Order 1992 (S.I. 1992/938)
- Libya (United Nations Prohibition of Flights) Order 1992 (S.I. 1992/973)
- Libya (United Nations Prohibition of Flights) (Dependent Territories) Order 1992 (S.I. 1992/974)
- Libya (United Nations Sanctions) Order 1992 (S.I. 1992/975)
- Libya (United Nations Sanctions) (Dependent Territories) Order 1992 (S.I. 1992/976)
- Libya (United Nations Sanctions) (Channel Islands) Order 1992 (S.I. 1992/977)
- Newcastle and Gateshead and Sunderland and South Shields Water (Amendment of Local Enactments) Order 1992 (S.I. 1992/978)
- School Teachers' Pay and Conditions Act 1991 (Commencement No. 3) Order 1992 (S.I. 1992/988)
- Education (School Teachers' Pay and Conditions) (No. 2) Order 1992 (S.I. 1992/989)
- Shetland Islands Area (Electoral Arrangements) Order 1992 (S.I. 1992/995) (S. 95)
- Highland Regional Council (Abhainn Mhungasdail) Water Order 1992 (S.I. 1992/998)

== 1001–1100 ==
- Liquor Licensing (Fees) (Scotland) Variation Order 1992 (S.I. 1992/1011)
- Seed Potatoes (Fees) (Scotland) Regulations 1992 (S.I. 1992/1022)
- Electricity (Restrictive Trade Practices Act 1976) (Exemptions) Order 1992 (S.I. 1992/1024)
- Designation of Institutions of Higher Education (Scotland) Order 1992 (S.I. 1992/1025)
- Social Security (Claims and Payments) Amendment Regulations 1992 (S.I. 1992/1026)
- Limited Partnerships (Unrestricted Size) No. 3 Regulations 1992 (S.I. 1992/1027)
- Partnerships (Unrestricted Size) No. 9 Regulations 1992 (S.I. 1992/1028)
- A40 Trunk Road (Sandhills) Detrunking Order 1992 (S.I. 1992/1029)
- M1 Motorway (Junction 1 Improvement) Connecting Road Scheme 1992 (S.I. 1992/1030)
- Seed Potatoes (Amendment) Regulations 1992 (S.I. 1992/1031)
- Teignmouth Harbour Revision Order 1992 (S.I. 1992/1049)
- Petty Sessional Divisions (Humberside) Order 1992 (S.I. 1992/1057)
- Income Tax (Employments) (No. 22) Regulations 1992 (S.I. 1992/1059)
- Income Tax (Sub-contractors in the Construction Industry) (Amendment) Regulations 1992 (S.I. 1992/1065)
- Trade Marks and Service Marks (Fees) Rules 1992 (S.I. 1992/1069)
- Act of Sederunt (Adoption of Children) (Amendment) 1992 (S.I. 1992/1076)
- Act of Sederunt (Applications under Part III of the Criminal Justice (International Co-operation) Act 1990) 1992 (S.I. 1992/1077)
- Town and Country Planning (General Permitted Development) (Scotland) Amendment Order 1992 (S.I. 1992/1078)
- Combined Probation Areas (Humberside) Order 1992 (S.I. 1992/1082)
- Companies Act 1985 (Welsh Language Accounts) Regulations 1992 (S.I. 1992/1083)
- Sea Fishing (Enforcement of Community Conservation Measures) (Amendment) (No.2) Order 1992 (S.I. 1992/1084)
- Seeds (Fees) (Amendment) Regulations 1992 (S.I. 1992/1085)
- Education (Individual Pupils' Achievements, School Records and School Curriculum) (Amendment) Regulations 1992 (S.I. 1992/1089)
- Kent County Council (Royal Military Canal Bridge—Hamstreet) Scheme 1990 Confirmation Instrument 1992 (S.I. 1992/1091)
- Paisley College of Technology Scheme (Amendment) Regulations 1992 (S.I. 1992/1093)
- Education (Grant-maintained Schools) (Finance) (Amendment) Regulations 1992 (S.I. 1992/1095)
- Spray Irrigation (Definition) Order 1992 (S.I. 1992/1096)
- A19 Trunk Road (Easingwold Bypass) Order 1992 (S.I. 1992/1097)
- A19 Trunk Road (Raskelf Bridge to Shires Bridge) (Detrunking) Order 1992 (S.I. 1992/1098)

== 1101–1200 ==
- Income-related Benefits Schemes and Social Security (Recoupment) Amendment Regulations 1992 (S.I. 1992/1101)
- Social Security Revaluation of Earnings Factors Order 1992 (S.I. 1992/1102)
- National Health Service (Travelling Expenses and Remission of Charges) Amendment Regulations 1992 (S.I. 1992/1104)
- Cholsey and Wallingford Light Railway (Extension and Amendment) Order 1992 (S.I. 1992/1113)
- A23 Trunk Road (Purley Way, Croydon) (Prohibition of U-Turns) Order 1992 (S.I. 1992/1114)
- Merger Situation (Medicopharma NV and AAH Holdings plc) (Interim Provision) Order 1992 (S.I. 1992/1115)
- Social Security Commissioners Procedure (Amendment) Regulations 1992 (S.I. 1992/1121)
- Imported Food (Safeguards against Paralytic Toxin) (Pectinidae from Japan) Regulations 1992 (S.I. 1992/1122)
- First Community National Health Service Trust (Transfer of Trust Property) Order 1992 (S.I. 1992/1127)
- Mental Health Foundation of Mid Staffordshire National Health Service Trust (Transfer of Trust Property) Order 1992 (S.I. 1992/1128)
- South Devon Health Care National Health Service Trust (Transfer of Trust Property) Order 1992 (S.I. 1992/1129)
- Wirral Hospital National Health Service Trust (Transfer of Trust Property) Order 1992 (S.I. 1992/1130)
- A421 Road (M1 Motorway (Junction 13) to South Bedford) Order 1992 (S.I. 1992/1135)
- Harwich Parkeston Quay Harbour Revision Order 1992 (S.I. 1992/1136)
- Patents (Amendment) Rules 1992 (S.I. 1992/1142)
- Protection of Wrecks (Designation No.3) Order 1992 (S.I. 1992/1151)
- Milk Quota (Calculation of Standard Quota) (Scotland) Amendment Order 1992 (S.I. 1992/1152)
- Export of Goods (Control) (Amendment No. 2) Order 1992 (S.I. 1992/1154)
- Education (Schools) Act 1992 (Commencement No. 1) Order 1992 (S.I. 1992/1157)
- Tay River Purification Board (Establishment) Variation Order 1992 (S.I. 1992/1159)
- Tweed River Purification Board (Establishment) Variation Order 1992 (S.I. 1992/1160)
- Solway River Purification Board (Establishment) Variation Order 1992 (S.I. 1992/1161)
- Forth River Purification Board (Establishment) Variation Order 1992 (S.I. 1992/1162)
- North East River Purification Board (Establishment) Variation Order 1992 (S.I. 1992/1163)
- Highland River Purification Board (Establishment) Variation Order 1992 (S.I. 1992/1164)
- Clyde River Purification Board (Establishment) Variation Order 1992 (S.I. 1992/1165)
- Education (Further and Higher Education Institutions Access Funds) (Amendment) Regulations 1992 (S.I. 1992/1166)
- London Cab Order 1992 (S.I. 1992/1169)
- A12 Trunk Road (Eastern Avenue West and Eastern Avenue East, Havering) (40 mph Speed Limit) Order 1992 (S.I. 1992/1170)
- Building Regulations (Amendment) Regulations 1992 (S.I. 1992/1180)
- Northern Ireland (Emergency Provisions) Act 1991 (Commencement) Order 1992 (S.I. 1992/1181)
- Academic Awards and Distinctions (Scotland) Order of Council 1992 (S.I. 1992/1189)
- Gas Transit (EEC Requirements) Regulations 1992 (S.I. 1992/1190)
- Artificial Insemination of Cattle (Animal Health) (Scotland) Amendment Regulations 1992 (S.I. 1992/1192)
- A65 and A660 Trunk Roads (Burley-in-Wharfedale Bypass) Order 1992 (S.I. 1992/1194)
- A65 and A660 Trunk Roads (Burley-in-Wharfedale) (Detrunking) Order 1992 (S.I. 1992/1195)
- Company and Business Names (Amendment) Regulations 1992 (S.I. 1992/1196)
- European Parliamentary (United Kingdom Representatives) Pensions (Amendment) Order 1992 (S.I. 1992/1197)
- Income Support (General) Amendment (No.2) Regulations 1992 (S.I. 1992/1198)
- Horses (Protective Headgear for Young Riders) Act 1990 (Commencement) Order 1992 (S.I. 1992/1200)

== 1201–1300 ==
- Horses (Protective Headgear for Young Riders) Regulations 1992 (S.I. 1992/1201)
- Water (Timetable) (Scotland) Regulations 1992 (S.I. 1992/1202)
- Council Water Charge (Scotland) Regulations 1992 (S.I. 1992/1203)
- Police Cadets (Scotland) Amendment Regulations 1992 (S.I. 1992/1204)
- Education (Individual Pupils' Achievements) (Information) (Wales) Regulations 1992 (S.I. 1992/1205)
- Private Legislation Procedure (Scotland) General Order 1992 (S.I. 1992/1206)
- Severn Bridges (Description of Vehicles) Order 1992 (S.I. 1992/1207)
- Milk (Special Designation) Regulations (Amendment) Order 1992 (S.I. 1992/1208)
- Road Traffic Offenders (Prescribed Devices) Order 1992 (S.I. 1992/1209)
- Suckler Cow Premium (Amendment No. 2) Regulations 1992 (S.I. 1992/1210)
- Education (Student Loans) Regulations 1992 (S.I. 1992/1211)
- Undersized Whiting Order 1992 (S.I. 1992/1212)
- Road Traffic (Carriage of Dangerous Goods and Substances) (Amendment) Regulations 1992 (S.I. 1992/1213)
- Folkestone and District Water Company (Constitution and Regulation) Order 1992 (S.I. 1992/1214)
- Road Traffic (Temporary Restrictions) Procedure Regulations 1992 (S.I. 1992/1215)
- Tramcars and Trolley Vehicles (Modification of Enactments) Regulations 1992 (S.I. 1992/1217)
- Road Traffic (Temporary Restrictions) Act 1991 (Commencement) Order 1992 (S.I. 1992/1218)
- Local Government Superannuation (Reserve Forces) (Scotland) Regulations 1992 (S.I. 1992/1220)
- Courts and Legal Services Act 1990 (Commencement No.8) Order 1992 (S.I. 1992/1221)
- Eastbourne Hospitals National Health Service Trust (Transfer of Trust Property) Order 1992 (S.I. 1992/1222)
- Gatwick Airport London (Cargo Area Designation) Order 1992 (S.I. 1992/1223)
- Manchester International Airport (Cargo Area Designation) Order 1992 (S.I. 1992/1224)
- Milk Quota (Calculation of Standard Quota) (Amendment) Order 1992 (S.I. 1992/1225)
- Legal Aid (Scotland) Act 1986 (Commencement No. 3) Order 1992 (S.I. 1992/1226)
- Legal Aid in Contempt of Court Proceedings (Scotland) Regulations 1992 (S.I. 1992/1227)
- Legal Aid in Contempt of Court Proceedings (Scotland) (Fees) Regulations 1992 (S.I. 1992/1228)
- Protection of Wrecks (Designation No. 2) Order 1992 (S.I. 1992/1229)
- Court of Session etc. Fees Amendment (No. 2) Order 1992 (S.I. 1992/1230)
- Tayside Regional Council (Backwater and Lintrathen Reservoirs) Byelaws Extension Order 1992 (S.I. 1992/1231)
- Home-Grown Cereals Authority (Rate of Levy) Order 1992 (S.I. 1992/1233)
- A40 Trunk Road (Western Avenue, Hillingdon) (Prohibition of Use of Gap in Central Reservation) Order 1992 (S.I. 1992/1252)
- Control of Gold, Securities, Payments and Credits (Serbia and Montenegro) Directions 1992 (S.I. 1992/1265)
- Brechin and Bridge of Dun Light Railway Order 1992 (S.I. 1992/1267)
- Manchester Ship Canal Harbour Revision Order 1992 (S.I. 1992/1268)
- Education (Mandatory Awards) Regulations 1992 (S.I. 1992/1270)
- Local Government Act 1988 (Defined Activities) (Exemption) (Cambridge City Council) Order 1992 (S.I. 1992/1271)
- Export of Goods (Control) (Serbia and Montenegro Sanctions) Order 1992 (S.I. 1992/1272)
- Food Protection (Emergency Prohibitions) (Dioxins) (England) (No. 2) Order 1992 (S.I. 1992/1274)
- Statute Law (Repeals) Act 1989 (Commencement) Order 1992 (S.I. 1992/1275)
- Royal Cornwall Hospitals and West Cornwall Hospital National Health Service Trust (Change of Name) Order 1992 (S.I. 1992/1276)
- Police (Amendment) (No. 2) Regulations 1992 (S.I. 1992/1278)
- Planning and Compensation Act 1991 (Commencement No. 9 and Transitional Provision) Order 1992 (S.I. 1992/1279)
- Town and Country Planning General Development (Amendment) (No. 3) Order 1992 (S.I. 1992/1280)
- Walsall Hospitals National Health Service Trust (Transfer of Trust Property) Order 1992 (S.I. 1992/1281)
- Free Zone (Port of Tilbury) Designation Order 1992 (S.I. 1992/1282)
- Motor Vehicles (Third Party Risks) (Amendment) Regulations 1992 (S.I. 1992/1283)
- Motor Vehicles (Third-Party Risks Deposits) Regulations 1992 (S.I. 1992/1284)
- Road Vehicles (Prohibition) Regulations 1992 (S.I. 1992/1285)
- Road Traffic Act 1991 (Commencement No 4 and Transitional Provisions) Order 1992 (S.I. 1992/1286)
- Merchant Shipping (Ministry of Defence Commercially Managed Ships) Order 1992 (S.I. 1992/1293)
- Merchant Shipping (Ministry of Defence Yachts) Order 1992 (S.I. 1992/1294)
- Education (Chief Inspector of Schools in England) Order 1992 (S.I. 1992/1295)
- Transfer of Functions (Science) Order 1992 (S.I. 1992/1296)
- Transfer of Functions (Small Businesses) Order 1992 (S.I. 1992/1297)
- Arms Control and Disarmament (Privileges and Immunities) Act 1988 (Overseas Territories) Order 1992 (S.I. 1992/1298)
- Child Abduction and Custody (Parties to Conventions) (Amendment) (No. 2) Order 1992 (S.I. 1992/1299)
- Extradition (British Antarctic Territory) (Commonwealth Countries, Colonies and Republic of Ireland) Order 1992 (S.I. 1992/1300)

== 1301–1400 ==
- The Official Secrets Act 1989 (Hong Kong) Order 1992 (S.I. 1992/1301)
- Serbia and Montenegro (United Nations Sanctions) Order 1992 (S.I. 1992/1302)
- Serbia and Montenegro (United Nations Sanctions) (Dependent Territories) Order 1992 (S.I. 1992/1303)
- Serbia and Montenegro (United Nations Prohibition of Flights) Order 1992 (S.I. 1992/1304)
- Serbia and Montenegro (United Nations Prohibition of Flights) (Dependent Territories) Order 1992 (S.I. 1992/1305)
- Copyright (Isle of Man) (Revocation) Order 1992 (S.I. 1992/1306)
- Home Loss Payments (Northern Ireland) Order 1992 (S.I. 1992/1307)
- Serbia and Montenegro (United Nations Sanctions) (Channel Islands) Order 1992 (S.I. 1992/1308)
- Social Security (Mortgage Interest Payments) (Northern Ireland) Order 1992 (S.I. 1992/1309)
- Still-Birth (Definition) (Northern Ireland) Order 1992 (S.I. 1992/1310)
- Transfer of Functions (National Heritage) Order 1992 (S.I. 1992/1311)
- Social Security (Australia) Order 1992 (S.I. 1992/1312)
- Copyright (Application to the Isle of Man) Order 1992 (S.I. 1992/1313)
- Transfers of Functions (Energy) Order 1992 (S.I. 1992/1314)
- Transfer of Functions (Financial Services) Order 1992 (S.I. 1992/1315)
- Transfer of Functions (Inner City Task Forces) Order 1992 (S.I. 1992/1316)
- Motor Vehicles (Driving Licences) (Amendment) (No. 2) Regulations 1992 (S.I. 1992/1318)
- Friendly Societies Act 1992 (Commencement No. 1) Order 1992 (S.I. 1992/1325)
- Income-Related Benefits Amendment Regulations 1992 (S.I. 1992/1326)
- Devon Ambulance Service National Health Service Trust (Establishment) Amendment Order 1992 (S.I. 1992/1327)
- Housing (Disapplication of Financial Hardship Provision for Repairs Grant) (Scotland) Order 1992 (S.I. 1992/1328)
- Council Tax (Valuation of Dwellings) (Scotland) Regulations 1992 (S.I. 1992/1329)
- Council Tax (Contents of Valuation Lists) (Scotland) Regulations 1992 (S.I. 1992/1330)
- Council Tax (Liability of Owners) (Scotland) Regulations 1992 (S.I. 1992/1331)
- Council Tax (Administration and Enforcement) (Scotland) Regulations 1992 (S.I. 1992/1332)
- Council Tax (Exempt Dwellings) (Scotland) Order 1992 (S.I. 1992/1333)
- Council Tax (Dwellings) (Scotland) Regulations 1992 (S.I. 1992/1334)
- Council Tax (Reductions for Disabilities) (Scotland) Regulations 1992 (S.I. 1992/1335)
- Sexual Offences (Amendment) Act 1992 (Commencement) Order 1992 (S.I. 1992/1336)
- Taxes (Interest Rate) (Amendment No. 2) Regulations 1992 (S.I. 1992/1338)
- Motor Vehicles (Type Approval) (Great Britain) (Amendment) Regulations 1992 (S.I. 1992/1341)
- Motor Vehicles (Type Approval for Goods Vehicles) (Great Britain) (Amendment) (No. 2) Regulations 1992 (S.I. 1992/1342)
- Police Pensions (Amendment) Regulations 1992 (S.I. 1992/1343)
- Sea Fish (Specified Sea Areas) (Regulation of Nets and Other Fishing Gear) (Variation) Order 1992 (S.I. 1992/1344)
- Civil Courts (Amendment No. 2) Order 1992 (S.I. 1992/1345)
- Finance Act 1991, section 58, (Commencement No. 2) Regulations 1992 (S.I. 1992/1346)
- Transport and Works Act 1992 (Commencement No. 1) Order 1992 (S.I. 1992/1347)
- Education Assets Board (Transfers under the Education Reform Act 1988) Regulations 1992 (S.I. 1992/1348)
- Neath Canal (Cnel Bach) (Repeal of Local Enactments) Order 1992 (S.I. 1992/1349)
- Local Authorities (Capital Finance) (Approved Investments) (Amendment) Regulations 1992 (S.I. 1992/1353)
- Motor Vehicles (Driving Licences) (Large Goods and Passenger-Carrying Vehicles) (Amendment) (No. 3) Regulations 1992 (S.I. 1992/1356)
- Food (Lot Marking) Regulations 1992 (S.I. 1992/1357)
- Environmentally Sensitive Areas (Cambrian Mountains) Designation (Amendment) Order 1992 (S.I. 1992/1359)
- Competition and Service (Utilities) Act 1992 Designation Order 1992 (S.I. 1992/1360)
- Sheep Scab (Revocation) Order 1992 (S.I. 1992/1361)
- Non-Domestic Rating Contributions (England) (Amendment) Regulations 1992 (S.I. 1992/1363)
- Motorways Traffic (England and Wales) (Amendment) Regulations 1992 (S.I. 1992/1364)
- Army Terms of Service Regulations 1992 (S.I. 1992/1365)
- Army Terms of Service (Part-time Service in Northern Ireland) Regulations 1992 (S.I. 1992/1366)
- Control of Pollution (Licensing of Waste Disposal) (Scotland) Amendment Regulations 1992 (S.I. 1992/1368)
- Blood Tests (Evidence of Paternity) (Amendment) Regulations 1992 (S.I. 1992/1369)
- Motor Vehicles (Off Road Events) Regulations 1992 (S.I. 1992/1370)
- Special Roads (Notice of Opening) Regulations 1992 (S.I. 1992/1371)
- London Priority Route Order 1992 (S.I. 1992/1372)
- A1 Trunk Road (Holloway Road, Islington) Experimental Traffic Order 1992 (S.I. 1992/1374)
- County Council of Norfolk (A1151 Wroxham/Hoveton Bypass, River Bure Bridge) Scheme 1988 Confirmation Instrument 1992 (S.I. 1992/1378)
- Sheriffs' Fees (Amendment) Order 1992 (S.I. 1992/1379)
- Portsmouth (Pilotage) Harbour Revision Order 1992 (S.I. 1992/1380)
- Control of Gold, Securities, Payments and Credits (Serbia and Montenegro) (Revocation) Directions 1992 (S.I. 1992/1381)
- Education (School Performance Information) (England) Regulations 1992 (S.I. 1992/1385)
- Sea Fish Industry Authority (Levy) (Amendment) Regulations 1992 Confirmatory Order 1992 (S.I. 1992/1386)
- Food Protection (Emergency Prohibitions) (Paralytic Shellfish Poisoning) Order 1992 (S.I. 1992/1387)
- Northern Ireland (Emergency Provisions) Act 1991 (Continuance) Order 1992 (S.I. 1992/1390)

== 1401–1500 ==
- Council Tax (Discounts) (Scotland) Order 1992 (S.I. 1992/1408)
- Council Tax (Discounts) (Scotland) Regulations 1992 (S.I. 1992/1409)
- Road Traffic Act 1991 (Commencement No. 4 and Transitional Provisions) (Amendment) Order 1992 (S.I. 1992/1410)
- Northern Ireland (Emergency and Prevention of Terrorism Provisions) (Continuance) Order 1992 (S.I. 1992/1413)
- Export of Goods (Control) (Serbia and Montenegro Sanctions) (Revocation) Order 1992 (S.I. 1992/1419)
- Industrial Training Levy (Engineering Construction Board) Order 1992 (S.I. 1992/1420)
- Harbour Works (Assessment of Environmental Effects) Regulations 1992 (S.I. 1992/1421)
- Act of Sederunt (Rules of the Court of Session Amendment No.4) (Solicitors, Notaries Public, Qualified Conveyancers and Executry Practitioners) 1992 (S.I. 1992/1422)
- Offshore Installations (Safety Zones) (No. 2) Order 1992 (S.I. 1992/1429)
- County Council of Norfolk (Reconstruction of Magdalen Bridge) Scheme 1991 Confirmation Instrument 1992 (S.I. 1992/1430)
- Child Support Act 1991 (Commencement No. 1) Order 1992 (S.I. 1992/1431)
- Police (Scotland) Amendment Regulations 1992 (S.I. 1992/1432)
- Act of Sederunt (Rules of the Court of Session Amendment No.3) (Taxation of Accounts) 1992 (S.I. 1992/1433)
- Act of Sederunt (Solicitor and Client Accounts in the Sheriff Court) 1992 (S.I. 1992/1434)
- Dundee Port Authority Harbour Revision Order 1992 (S.I. 1992/1435)
- Local Government Act 1988 (Defined Activities) (Exemption) (Erewash Borough Council) Order 1992 (S.I. 1992/1436)
- British Technology Group Act 1991 (Government Shareholding) Order 1992 (S.I. 1992/1437)
- Partnerships (Unrestricted Size) No. 4 (Amendment) Regulations 1992 (S.I. 1992/1438)
- Partnerships (Unrestricted Size) No. 10 Regulations 1992 (S.I. 1992/1439)
- Social Security (Contributions) Amendment (No. 6) Regulations 1992 (S.I. 1992/1440)
- Nursing Homes Registration (Scotland) Amendment Regulations 1992 (S.I. 1992/1443)
- Devon Ambulance Service National Health Service Trust (Transfer of Trust Property) Order 1992 (S.I. 1992/1444)
- Exeter and District Community Health Service National Health Service Trust (Transfer of Trust Property) Order 1992 (S.I. 1992/1445)
- Northern Devon Healthcare National Health Service Trust (Transfer of Trust Property) Order 1992 (S.I. 1992/1446)
- Scarborough and North East Yorkshire Health Care National Health Service Trust (Transfer of Trust Property) Order 1992 (S.I. 1992/1447)
- A13 Trunk Road (West of Heathway to Wennington Section, Trunk Road and Slip Roads) Order 1992 (S.I. 1992/1458)
- A13 Trunk Road (West of Heathway to Wennington Section, Detrunking) Order 1992 (S.I. 1992/1459)
- Local Government Finance Act 1992 (Commencement No. 3) Order 1992 (S.I. 1992/1460)
- City of Manchester (Bradford Mill Bridge) Scheme 1992 Confirmation Instrument 1992 (S.I. 1992/1463)
- Hovercraft (Fees) Regulations 1992 (S.I. 1992/1478)
- Sea Fishing (Enforcement of Community Conservation Measures) (Amendment) (No. 3) Order 1992 (S.I. 1992/1485)
- Non-Domestic Rating Act 1992 (Commencement No. 1) Order 1992 (S.I. 1992/1486)
- Act of Adjournal (Consolidation Amendment) (Criminal Justice International Co-operation Act 1990) 1992 (S.I. 1992/1489)
- Poultry Flocks, Hatcheries and Processed Animal Protein (Fees) Order 1992 (S.I. 1992/1490)
- Planning and Compensation Act 1991 (Commencement No. 10 and Transitional Provision) Order 1992 (S.I. 1992/1491)
- Town and Country Planning General Regulations 1992 (S.I. 1992/1492)
- Town and Country Planning General Development (Amendment) (No. 4) Order 1992 (S.I. 1992/1493)
- Town and Country Planning (Assessment of Environmental Effects) (Amendment) Regulations 1992 (S.I. 1992/1494)
- Local Government (Access to Information) (Variation) Order 1992 (S.I. 1992/1497)

== 1501–1600 ==
- Immigration (Registration with Police) (Amendment) Regulations 1992 (S.I. 1992/1503)
- Registration of Births and Deaths (Welsh Language) (Amendment) Regulations 1992 (S.I. 1992/1504)
- A13 Trunk Road (Wennington to Dartford Tunnel Interchange Section, Detrunking) Order 1992 (S.I. 1992/1505)
- A13 Trunk Road (Wennington to Mar Dyke Section, Trunk Road and Slip Roads) Order 1992 (S.I. 1992/1506)
- Food Safety (Fisheries Products) (Derogations) Regulations 1992 (S.I. 1992/1507)
- Food Safety (Live Bivalve Molluscs) (Derogations) Regulations 1992 (S.I. 1992/1508)
- National Health Service (General Dental Services) Amendment Regulations 1992 (S.I. 1992/1509)
- Value Added Tax (Payments on Account) Order 1992 (S.I. 1992/1510)
- Non-Domestic Rating (Collection and Enforcement) (Local Lists) (Amendment) Regulations 1992 (S.I. 1992/1512)
- Non-Domestic Rating (Collection and Enforcement) (Central Lists) (Amendment) Regulations 1992 (S.I. 1992/1513)
- Non-Domestic Rating (Transitional Period) (Amendment) Regulations 1992 (S.I. 1992/1514)
- Non-Domestic Rating (Payment of Interest) (Amendment) Regulations 1992 (S.I. 1992/1515)
- Non-Domestic Rating Contributions (England) (Amendment) (No. 2) Regulations 1992 (S.I. 1992/1516)
- County Council of Norfolk (Reconstruction of Magdalen Bridge—Temporary Bridge) Scheme 1991 Confirmation Instrument 1992 (S.I. 1992/1517)
- Medicines (Medicated Animal Feeding Stuffs) (No. 2) Regulations 1992 (S.I. 1992/1520)
- Motor Vehicles (Off Road Events) (Amendment) Regulations 1992 (S.I. 1992/1523)
- Health and Safety (Leasing Arrangements) Regulations 1992 (S.I. 1992/1524)
- Cosmetic Products (Safety) (Amendment) Regulations 1992 (S.I. 1992/1525)
- Special Constables (Amendment) Regulations 1992 (S.I. 1992/1526)
- Reservoirs (Panels of Civil Engineers) (Application and Fees) Regulations 1992 (S.I. 1992/1527)
- National Health Service (General Dental Services) (Scotland) Amendment (No.2) Regulations 1992 (S.I. 1992/1528)
- Valuation and Community Charge Tribunals (Amendment) (Allowances) Regulations 1992 (S.I. 1992/1529)
- Community Charges and Non-Domestic Rating (Demand Notices) (Wales) (Amendment) (No. 3) Regulations 1992 (S.I. 1992/1530)
- Occupational and Personal Pension Schemes (Miscellaneous Amendments) Regulations 1992 (S.I. 1992/1531)
- Social Security Act 1990 (Commencement No. 5) Order 1992 (S.I. 1992/1532)
- Act of Sederunt (Rules of the Court of Session Amendment No.5) (Public Trusts) 1992 (S.I. 1992/1533)
- Medicines (Products Other Than Veterinary Drugs) (Prescription Only) Amendment Order 1992 (S.I. 1992/1534)
- Medicines (Products Other Than Veterinary Drugs) (General Sale List) Amendment Order 1992 (S.I. 1992/1535)
- Value Added Tax (Payments on Account) Regulations 1992 (S.I. 1992/1536)
- Building Societies (Member States) Order 1992 (S.I. 1992/1547)
- Education (National Curriculum) (Foundation Subjects at Key Stage 4) Order 1992 (S.I. 1992/1548)
- Coast Protection (Variation of Excluded Waters) (Chichester, Langstone and Portsmouth Harbours) Regulations 1992 (S.I. 1992/1549)
- Charge Limitation (England) (Maximum Amounts) Order 1992 (S.I. 1992/1550)
- Sports Grounds and Football (Amendment of Various Orders) Order 1992 (S.I. 1992/1554)
- Occupational Pension Schemes (Deficiency on Winding Up etc.) Regulations 1992 (S.I. 1992/1555)
- Public Order (Football Exclusion) (Amendment) Order 1992 (S.I. 1992/1556)
- Combined Probation Areas (Derbyshire) Order 1992 (S.I. 1992/1557)
- Beaumaris Port Health Authority (Revocation) Order 1992 (S.I. 1992/1558)
- Town and Country Planning (Special Enforcement Notices) Regulations 1992 (S.I. 1992/1562)
- Town and Country Planning General Development (Amendment) (No. 5) Order 1992 (S.I. 1992/1563)
- Merchant Shipping (Safe Manning Document) Regulations 1992 (S.I. 1992/1564)
- Local Loans (Procedure) (Amendment) Regulations 1992 (S.I. 1992/1565)
- Public Works Loans (Fees) (Amendment) Regulations 1992 (S.I. 1992/1566)
- Fatal Accidents and Sudden Deaths Inquiry Procedure (Scotland) Amendment Rules 1992 (S.I. 1992/1568)
- United Bristol Healthcare National Health Service Trust (Transfer of Trust Property) (No. 2) Order 1992 (S.I. 1992/1578)
- Non-automatic Weighing Instruments (EEC Requirements) Regulations 1993 S.I. 1992/1579)
- Weights and Measures (Packaged Goods) (Amendment) Regulations 1992 (S.I. 1992/1580)
- Merchant Shipping (Navigational Warnings) (Amendment) Regulations 1992 (S.I. 1992/1581)
- Merchant Shipping (Signals of Distress) Rules 1992 (S.I. 1992/1582)
- Environmental Protection (Controls on Injurious Substances) (No. 2) Regulations 1992 (S.I. 1992/1583)
- Non-Domestic Rating Contributions (Wales) (Amendment) Regulations 1992 (S.I. 1992/1584)
- Income-related Benefits Schemes (Miscellaneous Amendments) (No. 2) Regulations 1992 (S.I. 1992/1585)
- Civil Legal Aid (Financial Conditions) (Scotland) Regulations 1992 (S.I. 1992/1586)
- Advice and Assistance (Financial Conditions) (Scotland) Regulations 1992 (S.I. 1992/1587)
- Advice and Assistance (Assistance by Way of Representation) (Scotland) Amendment Regulations 1992 (S.I. 1992/1588)
- Education (Assisted Places) (Scotland) Amendment Regulations 1992 (S.I. 1992/1589)
- St Mary's Music School (Aided Places) Amendment Regulations 1992 (S.I. 1992/1590)
- Weights and Measures (Isle of Man) Order 1992 (S.I. 1992/1591)
- Weights and Measures (Jersey) Order 1992 (S.I. 1992/1592)
- Weights and Measures (Northern Ireland) Order 1992 (S.I. 1992/1593)
- Transfer of Colleges of Further Education (Scotland) Order 1992 (S.I. 1992/1597)
- Housing (Percentage of Approved Expense for Repairs Grants) (Lead Plumbing and Radon Gas Works) (Scotland) Order 1992 (S.I. 1992/1598)
- Law Reform (Miscellaneous Provisions) (Scotland) Act 1990 (Commencement No. 10) Order 1992 (S.I. 1992/1599)

== 1601–1700 ==
- Imported Food (Bivalve Molluscs and Marine Gastropods from Japan) Regulations 1992 (S.I. 1992/1601)
- Motor Vehicles (Tests) (Amendment) (No. 2) Regulations 1992 (S.I. 1992/1609)
- Building Societies (Designated Capital Resources) Order 1992 (S.I. 1992/1611)
- Building Societies (Supplementary Capital) (Amendment) Order 1992 (S.I. 1992/1612)
- Oil and Fibre Plant Seeds (Amendment) Regulations 1992 (S.I. 1992/1613)
- Fodder Plant Seeds (Amendment) Regulations 1992 (S.I. 1992/1614)
- Seeds (National Lists of Varieties) (Amendment) Regulations 1992 (S.I. 1992/1615)
- Value Added Tax (General) (Amendment) (No.2) Regulations 1992 (S.I. 1992/1617)
- Local Authorities (Capital Finance) (Amendment) (No. 2) Regulations 1992 (S.I. 1992/1618)
- Private Medical Insurance (Disentitlement to Tax Relief and Approved Benefits) (Amendment) Regulations 1992 (S.I. 1992/1619)
- Town and Country Planning (Isles of Scilly) Order 1992 (S.I. 1992/1620)
- Motor Cars (Driving Instruction) (Amendment) Regulations 1992 (S.I. 1992/1621)
- Portsmouth Mile End (Albert Johnson Quay) Harbour Revision Order 1992 (S.I. 1992/1623)
- Local Government Act 1988 (Defined Activities) (Exemption) (Small Schools) Order 1992 (S.I. 1992/1626)
- Public Libraries (Inquiries Procedure) Rules 1992 (S.I. 1992/1627)
- Valuation Timetable (Scotland) Amendment Order 1992 (S.I. 1992/1628)
- Revenue Support Grant (Scotland) (No. 2) Order 1992 (S.I. 1992/1629)
- Planning and Compensation Act 1991 (Commencement No. 11 and Transitional Provisions) Order 1992 (S.I. 1992/1630)
- Special Constables (Amendment) (No. 2) Regulations 1992 (S.I. 1992/1641)
- Non-Domestic Rating Act 1992 (Commencement No. 2) Order 1992 (S.I. 1992/1642)
- Rating Lists (Valuation Date) Order 1992 (S.I. 1992/1643)
- Housing (Relevant Works) (Scotland) Regulations 1992 (S.I. 1992/1653)
- Value Added Tax (Cars) (Amendment) (No. 2) Order 1992 (S.I. 1992/1654)
- Friendly Societies (Modification of the Corporation Tax Acts) Regulations 1992 (S.I. 1992/1655)
- Criminal Justice Act 1991 (Contracted Out Prisons) Order 1992 (S.I. 1992/1656)
- Education (Assisted Places) (Incidental Expenses) (Amendment) Regulations 1992 (S.I. 1992/1661)
- Education (Grants) (Music and Ballet Schools) (Amendment) Regulations 1992 (S.I. 1992/1662)
- Chester-Bangor Trunk Road (A55) (St Asaph Business Park Slip Roads) Order 1992 (S.I. 1992/1664)
- Value Added Tax (Payments on Account) (No.2) Order 1992 (S.I. 1992/1668)
- Criminal Justice Act 1991 (Notice of Transfer) Regulations 1992 (S.I. 1992/1670)
- New Roads and Street Works Act 1991 (Commencement No. 4) (Scotland) Order 1992 (S.I. 1992/1671)
- Road Works (Sharing of Costs of Works) (Scotland) Regulations 1992 (S.I. 1992/1672)
- Road Works (Maintenance) (Scotland) Regulations 1992 (S.I. 1992/1673)
- Road Works (Reinstatement) (Scotland) Regulations 1992 (S.I. 1992/1674)
- Road Works (Qualifications of Supervisors and Operatives) (Scotland) Regulations 1992 (S.I. 1992/1675)
- Road Works (Inspection Fees) (Scotland) Regulations 1992 (S.I. 1992/1676)
- Sheriff (Removal from Office) Order 1992 (S.I. 1992/1677)
- PARLIAMENT S.I. 1992/1683)
- Telecommunications Act 1984 (Extension of Relevant Period) (No. 3) Order 1992 (S.I. 1992/1684)
- Radioactive Substances (Records of Convictions) Regulations 1992 (S.I. 1992/1685)
- New Roads and Street Works Act 1991 (Commencement No. 3) Order 1992 (S.I. 1992/1686)
- Street Works (Qualifications of Supervisors and Operatives) Regulations 1992 (S.I. 1992/1687)
- Street Works (Inspection Fees) Regulations 1992 (S.I. 1992/1688)
- Street Works (Reinstatement) Regulations 1992 (S.I. 1992/1689)
- Street Works (Sharing of Costs of Works) Regulations 1992 (S.I. 1992/1690)
- Street Works (Maintenance) Regulations 1992 (S.I. 1992/1691)
- Social Security (Widow's Benefit and Retirement Pensions) (Amendment) Regulations 1992 (S.I. 1992/1695)
- Greater London and Hertfordshire (County Boundaries) Order 1992 (S.I. 1992/1696)
- Education (National Curriculum) (Attainment Targets and Programmes of Study in Welsh) (Amendment) Order 1992 (S.I. 1992/1698)
- Companies (Single Member Private Limited Companies) Regulations 1992 (S.I. 1992/1699)
- Social Security Benefit (Persons Abroad) Amendment Regulations 1992 (S.I. 1992/1700)

== 1701–1800 ==
- Pensions for Dependants of the Prime Minister or Speaker (Designated Provisions) Regulations 1992 (S.I. 1992/1701)
- Northern Ireland Act 1974 (Interim Period Extension) Order 1992 (S.I. 1992/1702)
- Housing (Right to Buy) (Prescribed Persons) Order 1992 (S.I. 1992/1703)
- Housing (Right to Buy) (Mortgage Limit) Regulations 1992 (S.I. 1992/1704)
- Housing (Right to Buy) (Mortgage Costs) Order 1992 (S.I. 1992/1706)
- Housing (Right to Buy) (Prescribed Forms) (Amendment) Regulations 1992 (S.I. 1992/1707)
- Housing (Service Charge Loans) Regulations 1992 (S.I. 1992/1708)
- Housing (Preservation of Right to Buy) (Amendment) Regulations 1992 (S.I. 1992/1709)
- Housing (Right to Buy) (Prescribed Form: Right to a Mortgage) Regulations 1992 (S.I. 1992/1710)
- European Communities (Designation) (No. 2) Order 1992 (S.I. 1992/1711)
- Army, Air Force and Naval Discipline Acts (Continuation) Order 1992 (S.I. 1992/1712)
- Education (Inspectors of Schools in England) Order 1992 (S.I. 1992/1713)
- Child Abduction and Custody (Parties to Conventions) (Amendment) (No. 3) Order 1992 (S.I. 1992/1714)
- Criminal Justice Act 1988 (Torture) (Overseas Territories) (Amendment) Order 1992 (S.I. 1992/1715)
- Mauritius Appeals to Judicial Committee Order 1992 (S.I. 1992/1716)
- Merchant Shipping (Confirmation of Legislation) (Falkland Islands) Order 1992 (S.I. 1992/1717)
- Anatomy (Northern Ireland) Order 1992 (S.I. 1992/1718)
- Appropriation (No. 2) (Northern Ireland) Order 1992 (S.I. 1992/1719)
- Competition and Service (Electricity) (Northern Ireland) Order 1992 (S.I. 1992/1720)
- Criminal Justice (International Co-operation) Act 1990 (Enforcement of Overseas Forfeiture Orders) (Amendment) Order 1992 (S.I. 1992/1721)
- Drug Trafficking Offences Act 1986 (Designated Countries and Territories) (Amendment) Order 1992 (S.I. 1992/1722)
- Firearms (Amendment) (Northern Ireland) Order 1992 (S.I. 1992/1723)
- Football Spectators (Corresponding Offences in Italy, Scotland and Sweden) (Amendment) Order 1992 (S.I. 1992/1724)
- Housing (Northern Ireland) Order 1992 (S.I. 1992/1725)
- Licensing (Validation) (Northern Ireland) Order 1992 (S.I. 1992/1726)
- Vienna Document 1992 (Privileges and Immunities) Order 1992 (S.I. 1992/1727)
- Offshore, and Pipelines, Safety (Northern Ireland) Order 1992 (S.I. 1992/1728)
- Summer Time Order 1992 (S.I. 1992/1729)
- Crown Office (Forms and Proclamations Rules) Order 1992 (S.I. 1992/1730)
- Reciprocal Enforement of Foreign Judgments (Canada) (Amendment) Order 1992 (S.I. 1992/1731)
- Parliamentary Corporate Bodies (Crown Immunities etc.) Order 1992 (S.I. 1992/1732)
- Confiscation of the Proceeds of Drug Trafficking (Designated Countries and Territories) (Scotland) Amendment Order 1992 (S.I. 1992/1733)
- Criminal Justice (International Co-operation) Act 1990 (Enforcement of Overseas Forfeiture Orders) (Scotland) Amendment Order 1992 (S.I. 1992/1734)
- Social Security (Jersey and Guernsey) Order 1992 (S.I. 1992/1735)
- Merchant Shipping (Categorisation of Registries of Overseas Territories) Order 1992 (S.I. 1992/1736)
- Transfer of Functions (Treasury and Minister for the Civil Service) Order 1992 (S.I. 1992/1737)
- Trustee Investments (Additional Powers) Order 1992 (S.I. 1992/1738)
- Education (Chief Inspector of Schools in Wales) Order 1992 (S.I. 1992/1739)
- Education (Inspectors of Schools in Wales) Order 1992 (S.I. 1992/1740)
- Council Tax (Administration and Enforcement) (Attachment of Earnings Order) (Wales) Regulations 1992 (S.I. 1992/1741)
- Local Authorities (Calculation of Council Tax Base) (Amendment) Regulations 1992 (S.I. 1992/1742)
- Income Tax (Interest Relief) (Qualifying Lenders) Order 1992 (S.I. 1992/1745)
- Finance Act 1991, section 49, (Appointed Day) Order 1992 (S.I. 1992/1746)
- Parochial Fees Order 1992 (S.I. 1992/1747)
- Church of England Pensions (Amendment) Regulations 1992 (S.I. 1992/1748)
- Legal Officers (Annual Fees) Order 1992 (S.I. 1992/1749)
- Arms Control and Disarmament (Inspections) Act 1991 (Commencement) Order 1992 (S.I. 1992/1750)
- Gas (Modification of Therm Limits) Order 1992 (S.I. 1992/1751)
- Health and Safety (Fees) Regulations 1992 (S.I. 1992/1752)
- Housing and Planning Act 1986 (Commencement No. 17 and Transitional Provisions) Order 1992 (S.I. 1992/1753)
- North Hull Housing Action Trust (Transfer of Property) (No. 2) Order 1992 (S.I. 1992/1754)
- Local Government Finance Act 1992 (Commencement No. 4) Order 1992 (S.I. 1992/1755)
- Sole (Eastern English Channel) (Prohibition of Fishing) Order 1992 (S.I. 1992/1756)
- Motor Vehicles (Driving Licences) (Amendment) (No. 3) Regulations 1992 (S.I. 1992/1757)
- Motor Vehicles (Driving Licences) (Large Goods and Passenger-Carrying Vehicles) (Amendment) (No. 4) Regulations 1992 (S.I. 1992/1761)
- Stepps Bypass (M80) and Connecting Roads and the Glasgow Monklands Motorway (Stage I) (Speed Limit) Amendment Regulations 1992 (S.I. 1992/1762)
- Town and Country Planning (Control of Advertisements) (Scotland) Amendment Regulations 1992 (S.I. 1992/1763)
- Highlands and Islands Development Board Dissolution Order 1992 (S.I. 1992/1764)
- Coal Industry (Restructuring Grants) Order 1992 (S.I. 1992/1766)
- Caledonian MacBrayne Limited (Rateable Values) (Scotland) Order 1992 (S.I. 1992/1782)
- Glasgow Underground (Rateable Values) (Scotland) Order 1992 (S.I. 1992/1783)
- Lochaber Power Company (Rateable Values) (Scotland) Order 1992 (S.I. 1992/1784)
- Scottish Nuclear Limited (Rateable Values) (Scotland) Order 1992 (S.I. 1992/1785)
- Forth Ports plc (Rateable Values) (Scotland) Order 1992 (S.I. 1992/1786)
- Water Undertakings (Rateable Values) (Scotland) Order 1992 (S.I. 1992/1787)
- Scottish Power plc. (Rateable Values) (Scotland) Order 1992 (S.I. 1992/1788)
- British Alcan Primary and Recycling Ltd. (Rateable Values) (Scotland) Order 1992 (S.I. 1992/1789)
- Electricity Generators (Rateable Values) (Scotland) Order 1992 (S.I. 1992/1790)
- Mercury Communications Ltd. (Rateable Values) (Scotland) Order 1992 (S.I. 1992/1791)
- British Gas plc. (Rateable Values) (Scotland) Order 1992 (S.I. 1992/1792)
- Scottish Hydro-Electric plc. (Rateable Values) (Scotland) Order 1992 (S.I. 1992/1793)
- British Telecommunications plc. (Rateable Values) (Scotland) Order 1992 (S.I. 1992/1794)
- British Railways Board (Rateable Values) (Scotland) Order 1992 (S.I. 1992/1795)
- Oil Related and Petrochemical Plants (Rateable Values) (Scotland) Order 1992 (S.I. 1992/1796)
- Education (Assisted Places) (Amendment) Regulations 1992 (S.I. 1992/1798)

== 1801–1900 ==
- Education (Teachers) (Amendment) Regulations 1992 (S.I. 1992/1809)
- Civil Courts (Amendment No. 3) Order 1992 (S.I. 1992/1810)
- Health and Safety (Miscellaneous Provisions) (Metrication etc.) Regulations 1992 (S.I. 1992/1811)
- Child Support (Information, Evidence and Disclosure) Regulations 1992 (S.I. 1992/1812)
- Child Support (Maintenance Assessment Procedure) Regulations 1992 (S.I. 1992/1813)
- Council Tax Benefit (General) Regulations 1992 (S.I. 1992/1814)
- Child Support (Maintenance Assessments and Special Cases) Regulations 1992 (S.I. 1992/1815)
- Child Support (Arrears, Interest and Adjustment of Maintenance Assessments) Regulations 1992 (S.I. 1992/1816)
- Town and Country Planning (Fees for Applications and Deemed Applications) (Amendment) Regulations 1992 (S.I. 1992/1817)
- Sandwell Borough Council (Churchbridge Canal Bridges) Scheme 1991 Confirmation Instrument 1992 (S.I. 1992/1818)
- A1 Motorway (Walshford to Dishforth Section and Connecting Roads) Scheme 1992 (S.I. 1992/1819)
- Northern Ireland (Prescribed Area) (Amendment) Regulations 1992 (S.I. 1992/1820)
- Excise Duties (Small Non-Commercial Consignments) Relief (Amendment) Regulations 1992 (S.I. 1992/1821)
- Aylesbury Vale Community Healthcare National Health Service Trust (Establishment) Amendment Order 1992 (S.I. 1992/1822)
- A1 Trunk Road (Walshford to Dishforth Interchange Detrunking) Order 1992 (S.I. 1992/1823)
- A1 Motorway (Walshford to Dishforth Section: Parts of A1 Northbound Carriageway) Scheme 1992 (S.I. 1992/1824)
- A168 Trunk Road (Dishforth Interchange) Scheme 1992 (S.I. 1992/1825)
- A168 Trunk Road (Dishforth Interchange Slip Roads) Order 1992 (S.I. 1992/1826)
- A168 Trunk Road (Dishforth Interchange Link Road Detrunking) Order 1992 (S.I. 1992/1827)
- Parole Board (Transfer of Functions) Order 1992 (S.I. 1992/1829)
- North Yorkshire and West Yorkshire (County Boundaries) Order 1992 (S.I. 1992/1830)
- Local Government Finance (Consequential Amendment) (Coventry City Council) Order 1992 (S.I. 1992/1831)
- Gipsy Encampments (District of Daventry) Order 1992 (S.I. 1992/1832)
- Housing (Right to a Shared Ownership Lease) (Further Advances Limit) (No. 2) Regulations 1992 (S.I. 1992/1833)
- Justices' Clerks (Qualifications of Assistants) (Amendment) Rules 1992 (S.I. 1992/1834)
- Horticultural Development Council (Amendment) Order 1992 (S.I. 1992/1836)
- Assistance for Minor Works to Dwellings (Lead Pipes) Order 1992 (S.I. 1992/1837)
- Value Added Tax (Payments on Account) (No. 2) Regulations 1992 (S.I. 1992/1844)
- Assistance for Minor Works to Dwellings (Amendment) Regulations 1992 (S.I. 1992/1845)
- Crown Court (Amendment) Rules 1992 (S.I. 1992/1847)
- Criminal Justice Act 1991 (Dismissal of Transferred Charges) Rules 1992 (S.I. 1992/1848)
- Education (Charlotte Mason College of Education Higher Education Corporation) (Dissolution) Order 1992 (S.I. 1992/1849)
- Stafford and Staffordshire Moorlands (District Boundaries) Order 1992 (S.I. 1992/1850)
- Access to Personal Files (Housing) (Scotland) Regulations 1992 (S.I. 1992/1852)
- Data Protection (Regulation of Financial Services etc.) (Subject Access Exemption) (Amendment) Order 1992 (S.I. 1992/1855)
- Magistrates' Courts (Unit Fines) Rules 1992 (S.I. 1992/1856)
- Education (National Curriculum) (Assessment Arrangements for English, Mathematics, Science, Technology, History and Geography) (Key Stage 1) Order 1992 (S.I. 1992/1857)
- Education (National Curriculum) (Assessment Arrangements for English, Mathematics, Science and Technology) (Key Stage 3) Order 1992 (S.I. 1992/1858)
- City of Coventry (North-South Road Phase 1) (Coventry Canal Bridges) Scheme 1990 Confirmation Instrument 1992 (S.I. 1992/1859)
- Finance (No. 2) Act 1992 (Commencement) Order 1992 (S.I. 1992/1867)
- Museums and Galleries Act 1992 (Commencement) Order 1992 (S.I. 1992/1874)
- Telecommunication Apparatus (Approval Fees) (British Approvals Board for Telecommunications) Order 1992 (S.I. 1992/1875)
- Act of Sederunt (Fees of Witnesses and Shorthand Writers in the Sheriff Court) 1992 (S.I. 1992/1878)
- Act of Sederunt (Fees of Solicitors in Speculative Actions) 1992 (S.I. 1992/1879)
- Personal Community Charge (Nursing Students) (Scotland) Regulations 1992 (S.I. 1992/1880)
- Haddock (Specified Sea Areas) (Prohibition of Fishing) Order 1992 (S.I. 1992/1881)
- Industrial Training (Road Transport Board) (Revocation) Order 1992 (S.I. 1992/1895)
- Milk (Special Designations) (Scotland) Amendment Order 1992 (S.I. 1992/1896)
- Act of Sederunt (Fees of Advocates in Speculative Actions) 1992 (S.I. 1992/1897)
- Act of Sederunt (Rules of the Court of Session Amendment No.8) (Fees of Solicitors in Speculative Actions) 1992 (S.I. 1992/1898)
- Court of Protection (Amendment) Rules 1992 (S.I. 1992/1899)
- Charities Act 1992 (Commencement No. 1 and Transitional Provisions) Order 1992 (S.I. 1992/1900)

== 1901–2000 ==
- Charities (Misleading Names) Regulations 1992 (S.I. 1992/1901)
- Civil Aviation (Route Charges for Navigation Services) (Fourth Amendment) Regulations 1992 (S.I. 1992/1902)
- Town and Country Planning (Enforcement) (Inquiries Procedure) Rules 1992 (S.I. 1992/1903)
- Town and Country Planning (Enforcement Notices and Appeals) (Amendment) Regulations 1992 (S.I. 1992/1904)
- Act of Sederunt (Rules of the Court of Session Amendment No.6) (Shorthand Writers' Fees) 1992 (S.I. 1992/1905)
- Act of Sederunt (Rules of the Court of Session Amendment No.7) (Witnesses' Fees) 1992 (S.I. 1992/1906)
- Rules of the Supreme Court (Amendment No. 2) 1992 (S.I. 1992/1907)
- Council Tax Benefit (Transitional) Order 1992 (S.I. 1992/1909)
- Building (Self-Certification of Structural Design) (Scotland) Regulations 1992 (S.I. 1992/1911)
- Alcoholic Liquor (Amendment of Units of Measurement) Order 1992 (S.I. 1992/1917)
- Shipbuilders' Relief (Specified Structures) (Amendment) Order 1992 (S.I. 1992/1918)
- Environmentally Sensitive Areas (Loch Lomond) Designation Order 1992 (S.I. 1992/1919)
- Environmentally Sensitive Areas (Breadalbane) Designation Order 1992 (S.I. 1992/1920)
- Dartford-Thurrock Crossing Tolls Order 1992 (S.I. 1992/1933)
- Dartford-Thurrock Crossing (Amendment) Regulations 1992 (S.I. 1992/1934)
- Planning and Compensation Act 1991 (Commencement No. 12 and Transitional Provisions) (Scotland) Order 1992 (S.I. 1992/1937)
- Child Support Act 1991 (Commencement No. 2) Order 1992 (S.I. 1992/1938)
- Plant Breeders' Rights (Amendment) Regulations 1992 (S.I. 1992/1939)
- Plant Breeders' Rights (Miscellaneous Ornamental Plants) (Variation) Scheme 1992 (S.I. 1992/1940)
- Timeshare Act 1992 (Commencement) Order 1992 (S.I. 1992/1941)
- Timeshare (Cancellation Notices) Order 1992 (S.I. 1992/1942)
- Timeshare (Repayment of Credit on Cancellation) Order 1992 (S.I. 1992/1943)
- Town and Country Planning (Fees for Applications and Deemed Applications) (Scotland) Amendment Regulations 1992 (S.I. 1992/1951)
- Education (Government of Further Education Corporations) (Former Sixth Form Colleges) Regulations 1992 (S.I. 1992/1957)
- Northern Ireland (Emergency Provisions) Act 1991 (Amendment) Order 1992 (S.I. 1992/1958)
- A20 London–Folkestone–Dover Trunk Road (Sidcup Bypass Improvement Detrunking) Order 1992 (S.I. 1992/1961)
- Academic Awards and Distinctions (Queen Margaret College) (Scotland) Order of Council 1992 (S.I. 1992/1962)
- Education (Government of Further Education Corporations) (Former Further Education Colleges) Regulations 1992 (S.I. 1992/1963)
- Hastings and Rother National Health Service Trust (Transfer of Trust Property) Order 1992 (S.I. 1992/1964)
- County Court (Amendment No. 2) Rules 1992 (S.I. 1992/1965)
- Lay Representatives (Rights of Audience) Order 1992 (S.I. 1992/1966)
- Flavourings in Food Regulations 1992 (S.I. 1992/1971)
- Agricultural Holdings (Units of Production) Order 1992 (S.I. 1992/1972)
- Salmon Act 1986 (Commencement and Transitional Provisions) Order 1992 (S.I. 1992/1973)
- Salmon (Definition of Methods of Net Fishing and Construction of Nets) (Scotland) Regulations 1992 (S.I. 1992/1974)
- Western Isles Islands Council (Ardveenish) Harbour Revision Order 1992 (S.I. 1992/1975)
- Western Isles Islands Council (Breasclete) Harbour Revision Order 1992 (S.I. 1992/1976)
- Shetland Islands Council (North Haven, Fair Isle) Harbour Revision Order 1992 (S.I. 1992/1977)
- Food Additives Labelling Regulations 1992 (S.I. 1992/1978)
- Town and Country Planning General (Amendment) Regulations 1992 (S.I. 1992/1982)
- Education (National Curriculum) (Assessment Arrangements for English, Welsh, Mathematics, Science, Technology, Welsh Second Language, History and Geography) (Key Stage 1) (Wales) Order 1992 (S.I. 1992/1983)
- Bournemouth and District Water Company (Constitution and Regulation) Order 1992 (S.I. 1992/1988)
- Child Support (Collection and Enforcement) Regulations 1992 (S.I. 1992/1989)
- Local Government Superannuation (National Rivers Authority) Regulations 1992 (S.I. 1992/1991)
- Cheshire and Merseyside (County Boundaries) Order 1992 (S.I. 1992/1992)
- West Hampshire Water Company (Constitution and Regulation) Order 1992 (S.I. 1992/1993)

== 2001–2100 ==
- Child Resistant Packaging and Tactile Danger Warnings (Safety) Regulations 1992 (S.I. 1992/2006)
- Residential Care Homes (Amendment) Regulations 1992 (S.I. 1992/2007)
- Wireless Telegraphy (Cordless Telephone Apparatus) (Exemption) Regulations 1992 (S.I. 1992/2008)
- Wireless Telegraphy (Cordless Telephone Apparatus) (Restriction and Marking) Order 1992 (S.I. 1992/2009)
- Road Traffic Act 1991 (Commencement No. 5 and Transitional Provisions) Order 1992 (S.I. 1992/2010)
- Housing (Change of Landlord) (Payment of Disposal Cost by Instalments) (Amendment) (No. 2) Regulations 1992 (S.I. 1992/2011)
- East Hertfordshire Health National Health Service Trust (Changeof Name) Order 1992 (S.I. 1992/2014)
- Clatterbridge Centre for Oncology National Health Service Trust (Transfer of Trust Property) Order 1992 (S.I. 1992/2015)
- Road Vehicles (Construction and Use) (Amendment) (No. 4) Regulations 1992 (S.I. 1992/2016)
- Sea Fishing (Enforcement of Community Conservation Measures) (Amendment) (No. 4) Order 1992 (S.I. 1992/2017)
- A52 Trunk Road (Ashbourne Relief Road) Order 1992 (S.I. 1992/2018)
- Professions Supplementary to Medicine (Registration Rules) (Amendment) Order of Council 1992 (S.I. 1992/2021)
- Food Protection (Emergency Prohibitions) (Paralytic Shellfish Poisoning) (Revocation) Order 1992 (S.I. 1992/2024)
- Education (Registered Inspectors) (Fees) Regulations 1992 (S.I. 1992/2025)
- Cheshire and Greater Manchester (County and District Boundaries) Order 1992 (S.I. 1992/2026)
- Export of Goods (Control) (Amendment No. 3) Order 1992 (S.I. 1992/2035)
- Poultry Meat (Hygiene) (Amendment) Regulations 1992 (S.I. 1992/2036)
- Fresh Meat (Hygiene and Inspection) Regulations 1992 (S.I. 1992/2037)
- Town and Country Planning (Inquiries Procedure) Rules 1992 (S.I. 1992/2038)
- Town and Country Planning Appeals (Determination by Inspectors) (Inquiries Procedure) Rules 1992 (S.I. 1992/2039)
- County Court (Forms) (Amendment No. 2) Rules 1992 (S.I. 1992/2040)
- Further and Higher Education Act 1992 (Commencement No. 1 and Transitional Provisions) (Amendment) Order 1992 (S.I. 1992/2041)
- Education (National Curriculum) (Assessment Arrangements for English, Welsh, Mathematics, Science, Welsh Second Language and Technology) (Key Stage 3) (Wales) Order 1992 (S.I. 1992/2042)
- Transport and Works Act 1992 (Commencement No. 2) Order 1992 (S.I. 1992/2043)
- Transport (Guided Systems) Order 1992 (S.I. 1992/2044)
- Registration of Births, Still-births, Deaths and Marriages (Prescription of Forms) (Scotland) Amendment Regulations 1992 (S.I. 1992/2045)
- Magistrates' Courts Committees (Constitution) (Amendment) Regulations 1992 (S.I. 1992/2047)
- Management of Health and Safety at Work Regulations 1992 (S.I. 1992/2051)
- Land Registration (Scotland) Act 1979 (Commencement No.6) Order 1992 (S.I. 1992/2060)
- Poultry Meat (Hygiene) (Scotland) Amendment Regulations 1992 (S.I. 1992/2061)
- Environmentally Sensitive Areas (Loch Lomond) Designation Amendment Order 1992 (S.I. 1992/2062)
- Environmentally Sensitive Areas (Breadalbane) Designation Amendment Order 1992 (S.I. 1992/2063)
- Family Proceedings (Amendment No. 2) Rules 1992 (S.I. 1992/2067)
- Family Proceedings Courts (Miscellaneous Amendments) Rules 1992 (S.I. 1992/2068)
- Magistrates' Courts (Attendance Centre) Rules 1992 (S.I. 1992/2069)
- Magistrates' Courts (Notice of Transfer) (Children's Evidence) Rules 1992 (S.I. 1992/2070)
- Magistrates' Courts (Children and Young Persons) Rules 1992 (S.I. 1992/2071)
- Magistrates' Courts (Criminal Justice Act 1991) (Miscellaneous Amendments) Rules 1992 (S.I. 1992/2072)
- Finance Act 1989, section 178(1), (Appointed Day) Order 1992 (S.I. 1992/2073)
- Income Tax (Manufactured Interest) Regulations 1992 (S.I. 1992/2074)
- Taxes (Interest Rate) (Amendment No. 3) Regulations 1992 (S.I. 1992/2075)
- Community Service and Combination Orders Rules 1992 (S.I. 1992/2076)
- Probation (Amendment) (No. 2) Rules 1992 (S.I. 1992/2077)
- Building (Amendment of Prescribed Fees) Regulations 1992 (S.I. 1992/2079)
- Prison (Amendment) (No. 2) Rules 1992 (S.I. 1992/2080)
- Young Offender Institution (Amendment) (No. 2) Rules 1992 (S.I. 1992/2081)
- Charities (Scheme for the Transfer of Assets) (Scotland) Regulations 1992 (S.I. 1992/2082)
- Town and Country Planning (General Development Procedure) (Scotland) Amendment Order 1992 (S.I. 1992/2083)
- Town and Country Planning (General Permitted Development) (Scotland) Amendment (No.2) Order 1992 (S.I. 1992/2084)
- Town and Country Planning (Enforcement of Control) (No. 2) (Scotland) Regulations 1992 (S.I. 1992/2086)
- Wireless Telegraphy Apparatus Approval and Test Fees Order 1992 (S.I. 1992/2087)
- Greater London and Hertfordshire (County and District Boundaries) Order 1992 (S.I. 1992/2088)
- Land Registration Fees Order 1992 (S.I. 1992/2089)
- Greater London and Kent (County Boundaries) Order 1992 (S.I. 1992/2090)
- Cheshire and Greater Manchester (County and District Boundaries) (No. 2) Order 1992 (S.I. 1992/2091)
- Derbyshire and Nottinghamshire (County Boundaries) Order 1992 (S.I. 1992/2092)
- Surrey and West Sussex (County Boundaries) Order 1992 (S.I. 1992/2093)
- East Sussex, West Sussex and Kent (County Boundaries) Order 1992 (S.I. 1992/2096)
- Education (Further Education Corporations) Order 1992 (S.I. 1992/2097)
- Tower Hamlets (Prescribed Routes) Traffic Order 1968 (Variation) Order 1992 (S.I. 1992/2099)

== 2101–2200 ==
- Organic Products Regulations 1992 (S.I. 1992/2111)
- Children (Secure Accommodation) Amendment Regulations 1992 (S.I. 1992/2117)
- Criminal Justice Act 1991 (Commencement No. 3 (Amendment) and Transitional Provisions and Savings) (Scotland) Order 1992 (S.I. 1992/2118)
- Essex and Hertfordshire (County Boundaries) Order 1992 (S.I. 1992/2119)
- Greater Manchester and West Yorkshire (County and District Boundaries) Order 1992 (S.I. 1992/2120)
- Combined Probation Areas Order 1992 (S.I. 1992/2121)
- North, South and West Yorkshire (County and District Boundaries) Order 1992 (S.I. 1992/2122)
- Road Vehicles (Construction and Use) (Amendment) (No. 5) Regulations 1992 (S.I. 1992/2137)
- Housing Benefit and Community Charge Benefits (Miscellaneous Amendments) (No.2) Regulations 1992 (S.I. 1992/2148)
- Social Fund Maternity and Funeral Expenses (General) Amendment Regulations 1992 (S.I. 1992/2149)
- Education (Crewe and Alsager College of Higher Education Higher Education Corporation) (Dissolution) Order 1992 (S.I. 1992/2151)
- Education (Higher Education Corporations) (No. 8) Order 1992 (S.I. 1992/2152)
- Motor Vehicles (Type Approval) (Amendment) Regulations 1992 (S.I. 1992/2154)
- Income-related Benefits Schemes (Miscellaneous Amendments) (No. 3) Regulations 1992 (S.I. 1992/2155)
- United Kingdom Central Council for Nursing, Midwifery and Health Visiting (Electoral Scheme) Order 1992 (S.I. 1992/2159)
- United Kingdom Central Council for Nursing, Midwifery and Health Visiting (Membership Proposal) Approval Order 1992 (S.I. 1992/2160)
- Motor Vehicles (Type Approval) (Great Britain) (Amendment) (No. 2) Regulations 1992 (S.I. 1992/2161)
- Local Government Act 1988 (Defined Activities) (Exemption) (Tamworth Borough Council) Order 1992 (S.I. 1992/2162)
- National Health Service (Determination of Districts) (No. 3) Order 1992 (S.I. 1992/2163)
- National Health Service (District Health Authorities) (No. 3) Order 1992 (S.I. 1992/2164)
- Charities Accounts (Scotland) Regulations 1992 (S.I. 1992/2165)
- Red Bank Instrument of Management (Variation) Order 1992 (S.I. 1992/2170)
- Tribunals and Inquiries (Discretionary Inquiries) (Amendment) Order 1992 (S.I. 1992/2171)
- Education (Grants) (Voluntary Aided Sixth Form Colleges) Regulations 1992 (S.I. 1992/2181)
- Fines (Deductions from Income Support) Regulations 1992 (S.I. 1992/2182)
- Local Government Finance Act 1992 (Commencement No. 5 and Transitional Provisions) Order 1992 (S.I. 1992/2183)
- Non-Domestic Rating (Payment of Interest) (Scotland) Regulations 1992 (S.I. 1992/2184)
- Registration of Births, Deaths and Marriages (Miscellaneous Provisions) (Scotland) Amendment Regulations 1992 (S.I. 1992/2185)
- Registration of Births, Still-births, Deaths and Marriages (Prescription of Forms) (Scotland) Amendment (No. 2) Regulations 1992 (S.I. 1992/2186)
- Education (Higher Education Corporations) (Wales) (No. 2) Order 1992 (S.I. 1992/2190)
- Indictments (Procedure) (Amendment) Rules 1992 (S.I. 1992/2197)

== 2201–2300 ==
- Notification of Cooling Towers and Evaporative Condensers Regulations 1992 (S.I. 1992/2225)
- St Gabriel's, Knolle Park, Woolton, Liverpool Instrument of Management (Variation) Order 1992 (S.I. 1992/2226)
- Inshore Fishing (Prohibition of Fishing for Cockles) (Scotland) Order 1992 (S.I. 1992/2230)
- Gipsy Encampments (District of Vale of White Horse) Order 1992 (S.I. 1992/2238)
- Registered Homes (Amendment) Act 1991 (Commencement) Order 1992 (S.I. 1992/2240)
- Residential Care Homes (Amendment) (No. 2) Regulations 1992 (S.I. 1992/2241)
- Local Government (Promotion of Economic Development) (Amendment) Regulations 1992 (S.I. 1992/2242)
- Closure of Prisons (H.M. Prison Northeye) Order 1992 (S.I. 1992/2250)
- Education (London Residuary Body) (Transfer of Functions and Property) (No. 2) Order 1992 (S.I. 1992/2257)
- St Helens and Knowsley Hospital Services National Health Service Trust (Transfer of Trust Property) Order 1992 (S.I. 1992/2263)
- Education (School Performance Information) (Wales) Regulations 1992 (S.I. 1992/2274)
- National Rivers Authority (Anglian Region) (Reconstitution of the Welland and Deepings Internal Drainage Board) Order 1992 (S.I. 1992/2287)
- Education Assets Board (Transfers under the Further and Higher Education Act 1992) Regulations 1992 (S.I. 1992/2288)
- Act of Sederunt (Rules of the Court of Session Amendment No.9) (Miscellaneous) 1992 (S.I. 1992/2289)
- Diseases of Animals (Approved Disinfectants) (Amendment) (No. 2) Order 1992 (S.I. 1992/2290)
- Poisons List (Amendment) Order 1992 (S.I. 1992/2292)
- Poisons (Amendment) Rules 1992 (S.I. 1992/2293)
- Combined Probation Areas (Dyfed) Order 1992 (S.I. 1992/2294)

== 2301–2400 ==
- A595 Trunk Road (Foxfield Diversion and Detrunking) Order 1992 (S.I. 1992/2313)
- Offshore Installations (Safety Zones) (No.3) Order 1992 (S.I. 1992/2314)
- Education (Further Education Corporations) (No. 2) Order 1992 (S.I. 1992/2315)
- Loch Morar and River Morar Protection Order 1992 (S.I. 1992/2316)
- Housing (Right to Buy) (Priority of Charges) Order 1992 (S.I. 1992/2317)
- Mortgage Indemnities (Recognised Bodies) Order 1992 (S.I. 1992/2318)
- Goods Vehicles (Operators' Licences, Qualifications and Fees) (Amendment) Regulations 1992 (S.I. 1992/2319)
- Social Fund Cold Weather Payments (General) Amendment Regulations 1992 (S.I. 1992/2322)
- British Railways (Penalty Fares) Act 1989 (Activating No.4) Order 1992 (S.I. 1992/2323)
- British Railways (Penalty Fares) Act 1989 (Activating No. 5) Order 1992 (S.I. 1992/2324)
- Insurance Companies (Pensions Business) (Transitional Provisions) Regulations 1992 (S.I. 1992/2326)
- South Ayrshire Hospitals National Health Service Trust (Appointment of Trustees) Order 1992 (S.I. 1992/2337)
- Royal Scottish National Hospital and Community National Health Service Trust (Establishment) Order 1992 (S.I. 1992/2338)
- Aberdeen Royal Hospitals National Health Service Trust (Appointment of Trustees) Order 1992 (S.I. 1992/2339)
- Seed Potatoes (Fees) (Scotland) Amendment Regulations 1992 (S.I. 1992/2340)
- Environmentally Sensitive Areas (Cambrian Mountains) Designation (Amendment No. 2) Order 1992 (S.I. 1992/2342)
- Police (Pensions and Injury Benefit) (Amendment) Regulations 1992 (S.I. 1992/2349)
- Wildlife and Countryside Act 1981 (Variation of Schedules 5 and 8) Order 1992 (S.I. 1992/2350)
- Fresh Meat and Poultry Meat (Hygiene, Inspection and Examinations for Residues) (Charges) (Amendment) Regulations 1992 (S.I. 1992/2353)
- A50 Trunk Road (Blythe Bridge to Queensway and Connecting Roads) Supplementary Order 1992 (S.I. 1992/2354)
- Charities (Receiver and Manager) Regulations 1992 (S.I. 1992/2355)
- Merchant Shipping (Categorisation of Waters) Regulations 1992 (S.I. 1992/2356)
- Merchant Shipping (Passenger Ships of Classes IV, V, VI, & VI(A) -Bridge Visibility) Regulations 1992 (S.I. 1992/2357)
- Merchant Shipping (Passenger Ship Construction and Survey) (Amendment) Regulations 1992 (S.I. 1992/2358)
- Merchant Shipping (Life-Saving Appliances for Passenger Ships of Classes III to VI (A)) Regulations 1992 (S.I. 1992/2359)
- Merchant Shipping (Fire Protection) (Amendment) Regulations 1992 (S.I. 1992/2360)
- Education (Publication of Draft Proposals and Orders) (Further Education Corporations) Regulations 1992 (S.I. 1992/2361)
- Grants to Voluntary Organisations (Specified Date) Order 1992 (S.I. 1992/2362)
- Imported Food and Feedingstuffs (Safeguards against Cholera) (Amendment) Regulations 1992 (S.I. 1992/2364)
- Fire Services (Appointments and Promotion) (Amendment) (No. 2) Regulations 1992 (S.I. 1992/2365)
- Zootechnical Standards Regulations 1992 (S.I. 1992/2370)
- Local Government Act 1992 (Commencement No.1) Order 1992 (S.I. 1992/2371)
- Electromagnetic Compatibility Regulations 1992 (S.I. 1992/2372)
- Electromagnetic Compatibility (Wireless Telegraphy Apparatus) Certification and Test Fees Regulations 1992 (S.I. 1992/2373)
- East Worcestershire Waterworks Company (Constitution and Regulation) Order 1992 (S.I. 1992/2374)
- Further and Higher Education Act 1992 (Commencement No. 2) Order 1992 (S.I. 1992/2377)
- Petroleum (Production) (Seaward Areas) (Amendment) Regulations 1992 (S.I. 1992/2378)
- National Health Service (Fund—Holding Practices) (Applications and Recognition) (Scotland) Amendment Regulations 1992 (S.I. 1992/2379)
- Ports Act 1991 (Transfer of Local Lighthouses: Appointed Day) Order 1992 (S.I. 1992/2381)
- Control of Substances Hazardous to Health (Amendment) Regulations 1992 (S.I. 1992/2382)
- United Kingdom Ecolabelling Board Regulations 1992 (S.I. 1992/2383)
- Further Education (Sponsoring Bodies) Order 1992 (S.I. 1992/2400)

== 2401–2500 ==
- National Health Service (General Medical and Pharmaceutical Services) (Scotland) Amendment (No.2) Regulations 1992 (S.I. 1992/2401)
- Road Traffic Accidents (Payments for Treatment) Order 1992 (S.I. 1992/2402)
- National Health Service (General Medical Services) Amendment Regulations 1992 (S.I. 1992/2412)
- Planning and Compensation Act 1991 (Commencement No. 13 and Transitional Provision) Order 1992 (S.I. 1992/2413)
- Town and Country Planning (Simplified Planning Zones) Regulations 1992 (S.I. 1992/2414)
- Export of Dangerous Chemicals Regulations 1992 (S.I. 1992/2415)
- Telecommunications Terminal Equipment Regulations 1992 (S.I. 1992/2423)
- Local Authorities (Funds) (England) Regulations 1992 (S.I. 1992/2428)
- Billing Authorities (Alteration of Requisite Calculations) (England) Regulations 1992 (S.I. 1992/2429)
- Local Government (Compensation for Premature Retirement) (Amendment) Regulations 1992 (S.I. 1992/2432)
- M4 Motorway Castleton—Coryton (Connecting Roads, Special Roads) Scheme 1992 Confirmation Instrument 1992 (S.I. 1992/2446)
- Goods Vehicles (Plating and Testing) (Amendment) (No. 2) Regulations 1992 (S.I. 1992/2447)
- Social Fund Cold Weather Payments (General) Amendment (No.2) Regulations 1992 (S.I. 1992/2448)
- Protection of Trading Interests (US Cuban Assets Control Regulations) Order 1992 (S.I. 1992/2449)
- Town and Country Planning General Development (Amendment) (No. 6) Order 1992 (S.I. 1992/2450)
- Taxes (Interest Rate) (Amendment No. 4) Regulations 1992 (S.I. 1992/2451)
- Companies Act 1985 (Accounts of Small and Medium-Sized Enterprises and Publication of Accounts in ECUs) Regulations 1992 (S.I. 1992/2452)
- Local Government Finance Act 1992 (Commencement No. 6 and Transitional Provision) Order 1992 (S.I. 1992/2454)
- A3 Trunk Road (Wandsworth High Street, Wandsworth) (Box Junction) Order 1992 (S.I. 1992/2455)
- A259 Trunk Road (Folkestone Trunking and Detrunking) Order 1992 (S.I. 1992/2458)
- East Cheshire National Health Service Trust (Establishment) Order 1992 (S.I. 1992/2461)
- Cheshire Community Healthcare National Health Service Trust (Establishment) Order 1992 (S.I. 1992/2462)
- Countess of Chester Hospital National Health Service Trust (Establishment) Order 1992 (S.I. 1992/2463)
- Warrington Community Health Care National Health Service Trust (Establishment) Order 1992 (S.I. 1992/2464)
- Southport and Formby Community Health Services National Health Service Trust (Establishment) Order 1992 (S.I. 1992/2465)
- Halton General Hospital National Health Service Trust (Establishment) Order 1992 (S.I. 1992/2466)
- Wigan and Leigh Health Services National Health Service Trust (Establishment) Order 1992 (S.I. 1992/2467)
- West Lancashire National Health Service Trust (Establishment) Order 1992 (S.I. 1992/2468)
- Calderstones National Health Service Trust (Establishment) Order 1992 (S.I. 1992/2469)
- Chorley and South Ribble National Health Service Trust (Establishment) Order 1992 (S.I. 1992/2470)
- West Lindsey National Health Service Trust (Establishment) Order 1992 (S.I. 1992/2471)
- Leicester General Hospital National Health Service Trust (Establishment) Order 1992 (S.I. 1992/2472)
- Southern Derbyshire Mental Health National Health Service Trust (Establishment) Order 1992 (S.I. 1992/2473)
- Chesterfield and North Derbyshire Royal Hospital National Health Service Trust (Establishment) Order 1992 (S.I. 1992/2474)
- Nottinghamshire Ambulance Service National Health Service Trust (Establishment) Order 1992 (S.I. 1992/2475)
- Derby City General Hospital National Health Service Trust (Establishment) Order 1992 (S.I. 1992/2476)
- Central Nottinghamshire Healthcare National Health Service Trust (Establishment) Order 1992 (S.I. 1992/2477)
- Queen's Medical Centre, Nottingham, University Hospital National Health Service Trust (Establishment) Order 1992 (S.I. 1992/2478)
- Rotherham General Hospital's National Health Service Trust (Establishment) Order 1992 (S.I. 1992/2479)
- Barnsley District General Hospital National Health Service Trust (Establishment) Order 1992 (S.I. 1992/2480)
- Community Health Services, Southern Derbyshire National Health Service Trust (Establishment) Order 1992 (S.I. 1992/2481)
- Rotherham Priority Health Services National Health Service Trust (Establishment) Order 1992 (S.I. 1992/2482)
- Leicester Royal Infirmary National Health Service Trust (Establishment) Order 1992 (S.I. 1992/2483)
- Fosse Health, Leicestershire Community National Health Service Trust (Establishment) Order 1992 (S.I. 1992/2484)
- South Lincolnshire Community and Mental Health Services National Health Service Trust (Establishment) Order 1992 (S.I. 1992/2485)
- Glenfield Hospital National Health Service Trust (Establishment) Order 1992 (S.I. 1992/2486)
- Huddersfield Health Care Services National Health Service Trust (Establishment) Order 1992 (S.I. 1992/2487)
- Humberside Ambulance Service National Health Service Trust (Establishment) Order 1992 (S.I. 1992/2488)
- North Yorkshire Ambulance Service National Health Service Trust (Establishment) Order 1992 (S.I. 1992/2489)
- Pinderfields Hospitals National Health Service Trust (Establishment) Order 1992 (S.I. 1992/2490)
- Pontefract Hospitals National Health Service Trust (Establishment) Order 1992 (S.I. 1992/2491)
- Scunthorpe Community Health Care National Health Service Trust (Establishment) Order 1992 (S.I. 1992/2492)
- West Yorkshire Metropolitan Ambulance Service National Health Service Trust (Establishment) Order 1992 (S.I. 1992/2493)
- Scunthorpe and Goole Hospitals National Health Service Trust (Establishment) Order 1992 (S.I. 1992/2494)
- Wakefield and Pontefract Community Health National Health Service Trust (Establishment) Order 1992 (S.I. 1992/2495)
- Grimsby Health National Health Service Trust (Establishment) Order 1992 (S.I. 1992/2496)
- Leeds Community and Mental Health Services Teaching National Health Service Trust (Establishment) Order 1992 (S.I. 1992/2497)
- Calderdale Healthcare National Health Service Trust (Establishment) Order 1992 (S.I. 1992/2498)
- Royal Hull Hospitals National Health Service Trust (Establishment) Order 1992 (S.I. 1992/2499)
- East Yorkshire Hospitals National Health Service Trust (Establishment) Order 1992 (S.I. 1992/2500)

== 2501–2600 ==
- North Hampshire, Loddon Community National Health Service Trust (Establishment) Order 1992 (S.I. 1992/2501)
- Isle of Wight Community Healthcare National Health Service Trust (Establishment) Order 1992 (S.I. 1992/2502)
- Wiltshire Ambulance Service National Health Service Trust (Establishment) Order 1992 (S.I. 1992/2503)
- Hampshire Ambulance Service National Health Service Trust (Establishment) Order 1992 (S.I. 1992/2504)
- Andover District Community Health Care National Health Service Trust (Establishment) Order 1992 (S.I. 1992/2505)
- Portsmouth Hospitals National Health Service Trust (Establishment) Order 1992 (S.I. 1992/2506)
- St. Mary's Hospital National Health Service Trust (Establishment) Order 1992 (S.I. 1992/2507)
- Dorset Ambulance National Health Service Trust (Establishment) Order 1992 (S.I. 1992/2508)
- Southampton University Hospitals National Health Service Trust (Establishment) Order 1992 (S.I. 1992/2509)
- Whittington Hospital National Health Service Trust (Establishment) Order 1992 (S.I. 1992/2510)
- Enfield Community Care National Health Service Trust (Establishment) Order 1992 (S.I. 1992/2511)
- Havering Hospitals National Health Service Trust (Establishment) Order 1992 (S.I. 1992/2512)
- Thameside Community Health Care National Health Service Trust (Establishment) Order 1992 (S.I. 1992/2513)
- Mid Essex Community Health National Health Service Trust (Establishment) Order 1992 (S.I. 1992/2514)
- BHB Community Health Care National Health Service Trust (Establishment) Order 1992 (S.I. 1992/2515)
- Chase Farm Hospitals National Health Service Trust (Establishment) Order 1992 (S.I. 1992/2516)
- Redbridge Health Care National Health Service Trust (Establishment) Order 1992 (S.I. 1992/2517)
- Royal London Homoeopathic Hospital National Health Service Trust (Establishment) Order 1992 (S.I. 1992/2518)
- Camden and Islington Community Health Services National Health Service Trust (Establishment) Order 1992 (S.I. 1992/2519)
- Worthing Priority Care National Health Service Trust (Establishment) Order 1992 (S.I. 1992/2520)
- Crawley Horsham National Health Service Trust (Establishment) Order 1992 (S.I. 1992/2521)
- East Surrey Hospital and Community Healthcare National Health Service Trust (Establishment) Order 1992 (S.I. 1992/2522)
- Richmond, Twickenham and Roehampton Healthcare National Health Service Trust (Establishment) Order 1992 (S.I. 1992/2523)
- Merton and Sutton Community National Health Service Trust (Establishment) Order 1992 (S.I. 1992/2524)
- Severn National Health Service Trust (Establishment) Order 1992 (S.I. 1992/2525)
- Royal Devon and Exeter Healthcare National Health Service Trust (Establishment) Order 1992 (S.I. 1992/2526)
- Gloucestershire Royal National Health Service Trust (Establishment) Order 1992 (S.I. 1992/2527)
- Thanet Health Care National Health Service Trust (Establishment) Order 1992 (S.I. 1992/2528)
- Canterbury and Thanet Community Healthcare National Health Service Trust (Establishment) Order 1992 (S.I. 1992/2529)
- Queen Mary's Sidcup National Health Service Trust (Establishment) Order 1992 (S.I. 1992/2530)
- Mid Kent Healthcare National Health Service Trust (Establishment) Order 1992 (S.I. 1992/2531)
- Kent and Canterbury Hospitals National Health Service Trust (Establishment) Order 1992 (S.I. 1992/2532)
- Greenwich Healthcare National Health Service Trust (Establishment) Order 1992 (S.I. 1992/2533)
- Eastbourne and County Healthcare National Health Service Trust (Establishment) Order 1992 (S.I. 1992/2534)
- Bromley Hospitals National Health Service Trust (Establishment) Order 1992 (S.I. 1992/2535)
- Brighton Health Care National Health Service Trust (Establishment) Order 1992 (S.I. 1992/2536)
- Northwick Park Hospital National Health Service Trust (Establishment) Order 1992 (S.I. 1992/2537)
- Bedfordshire and Hertfordshire Ambulance and Paramedic Service National Health Service Trust (Establishment) Order 1992 (S.I. 1992/2538)
- West London Healthcare National Health Service Trust (Establishment) Order 1992 (S.I. 1992/2539)
- Hounslow and Spelthorne Community and Mental Health National Health Service Trust (Establishment) Order 1992 (S.I. 1992/2540)
- Riverside Mental Health National Health Service Trust (Establishment) Order 1992 (S.I. 1992/2541)
- Northumberland Mental Health National Health Service Trust (Establishment) Order 1992 (S.I. 1992/2542)
- South Tyneside Health Care National Health Service Trust (Establishment) Order 1992 (S.I. 1992/2543)
- South Cumbria Community and Mental Health National Health Service Trust (Establishment) Order 1992 (S.I. 1992/2544)
- Durham County Ambulance Service National Health Service Trust (Establishment) Order 1992 (S.I. 1992/2545)
- Cumbria Ambulance Service National Health Service Trust (Establishment) Order 1992 (S.I. 1992/2546)
- South West Durham Mental Health National Health Service Trust (Establishment) Order 1992 (S.I. 1992/2547)
- Westmorland Hospitals National Health Service Trust (Establishment) Order 1992 (S.I. 1992/2548)
- West Cumbria Health Care National Health Service Trust (Establishment) Order 1992 (S.I. 1992/2549)
- Gateshead Hospitals National Health Service Trust (Establishment) Order 1992 (S.I. 1992/2550)
- South Tees Community and Mental Health National Health Service Trust (Establishment) Order 1992 (S.I. 1992/2551)
- North Warwickshire National Health Service Trust (Establishment) Order 1992 (S.I. 1992/2552)
- Walsall Community Health National Health Service Trust (Establishment) Order 1992 (S.I. 1992/2553)
- Princess Royal Hospital National Health Service Trust (Establishment) Order 1992 (S.I. 1992/2554)
- South Worcestershire Community National Health Service Trust (Establishment) Order 1992 (S.I. 1992/2555)
- South Warwickshire General Hospitals National Health Service Trust (Establishment) Order 1992 (S.I. 1992/2556)
- Shropshire's Mental Health National Health Service Trust (Establishment) Order 1992 (S.I. 1992/2557)
- Mid—Staffordshire General Hospitals National Health Service Trust (Establishment) Order 1992 (S.I. 1992/2558)
- North Staffordshire Hospital Centre National Health Service Trust (Establishment) Order 1992 (S.I. 1992/2559)
- Kidderminster Health Care National Health Service Trust (Establishment) Order 1992 (S.I. 1992/2560)
- Wolverley National Health Service Trust (Establishment) Order 1992 (S.I. 1992/2561)
- Good Hope Hospital National Health Service Trust (Establishment) Order 1992 (S.I. 1992/2562)
- Burton Hospitals National Health Service Trust (Establishment) Order 1992 (S.I. 1992/2563)
- North East Worcestershire Community HealthCare National Health Service Trust (Establishment) Order 1992 (S.I. 1992/2564)
- West Suffolk Hospitals National Health Service Trust (Establishment) Order 1992 (S.I. 1992/2565)
- Ipswich Hospital National Health Service Trust (Establishment) Order 1992 (S.I. 1992/2566)
- Addenbrooke's National Health Service Trust (Establishment) Order 1992 (S.I. 1992/2567)
- Papworth Hospital National Health Service Trust (Establishment) Order 1992 (S.I. 1992/2568)
- James Paget Hospital National Health Service Trust (Establishment) Order 1992 (S.I. 1992/2569)
- North West Anglia Health Care National Health Service Trust (Establishment) Order 1992 (S.I. 1992/2570)
- Lifespan Health Care Cambridge National Health Service Trust (Establishment) Order 1992 (S.I. 1992/2571)
- Peterborough Hospitals National Health Service Trust (Establishment) Order 1992 (S.I. 1992/2572)
- Mid Anglia Community Health National Health Service Trust (Establishment) Order 1992 (S.I. 1992/2573)
- Oxfordshire Learning Disability National Health Service Trust (Establishment) Order 1992 (S.I. 1992/2574)
- South Buckinghamshire National Health Service Trust (Establishment) Order 1992 (S.I. 1992/2575)
- Horton General Hospital National Health Service Trust (Establishment) Order 1992 (S.I. 1992/2576)
- Two Shires Ambulance National Health Service Trust (Establishment) Order 1992 (S.I. 1992/2577)
- Royal Berkshire Ambulance National Health Service Trust (Establishment) Order 1992 (S.I. 1992/2578)
- Royal Berkshire and Battle Hospitals National Health Service Trust (Establishment) Order 1992 (S.I. 1992/2579)
- Radcliffe Infirmary National Health Service Trust (Establishment) Order 1992 (S.I. 1992/2580)
- West Berkshire Priority Care Service National Health Service Trust (Establishment) Order 1992 (S.I. 1992/2581)
- East Berkshire Community Health National Health Service Trust (Establishment) Order 1992 (S.I. 1992/2582)
- East Suffolk Local Health Services National Health Service Trust (Establishment) Order 1992 (S.I. 1992/2583)
- Southampton Community Health Services National Health Service Trust (Establishment) Order 1992 (S.I. 1992/2584)
- West Middlesex University Hospital National Health Service Trust (Establishment) Order 1992 (S.I. 1992/2585)
- Mancunian Community Health National Health Service Trust (Establishment) Order 1992 (S.I. 1992/2586)
- Bedford and Shires Health and Care National Health Service Trust (Establishment) Order 1992 (S.I. 1992/2587)
- Avalon, Somerset, National Health Service Trust (Establishment) Order 1992 (S.I. 1992/2588)
- British Railways (Penalty Fares) Act 1989 (Activating No. 6) Order 1992 (S.I. 1992/2589)
- Olive Oil (Marketing Standards) (Amendment) Regulations 1992 (S.I. 1992/2590)
- Artificial Insemination (Cattle and Pigs) (Fees) (Amendment) Regulations 1992 (S.I. 1992/2592)
- A4 Trunk Road (Avonmouth Relief Road) Order 1992 (S.I. 1992/2593)
- M5 Motorway (Junction 18 and Avonmouth Relief Road) (Slip Roads, Special Roads) Scheme 1992 (S.I. 1992/2594)
- Social Security (Miscellaneous Provisions) Amendment (No. 2) Regulations 1992 (S.I. 1992/2595)
- Food (Forces Exemptions) (Revocations) Regulations 1992 (S.I. 1992/2596)
- Food Safety (Amendment) (Metrication) Regulations 1992 (S.I. 1992/2597)
- Education (Parental Ballots for Acquisition of Grant-maintained Status) (Prescribed Body) Regulations 1992 (S.I. 1992/2598)
- Borough of Blaenau Gwent (Electoral Arrangements) Order 1992 (S.I. 1992/2600)

== 2601–2700 ==
- Environmental Protection Act 1990 (Modification of section 112) Regulations 1992 (S.I. 1992/2617)
- Merger Situation (Medicopharma NV and AAH Holdings plc) (Interim Provision) (Revocation) Order 1992 (S.I. 1992/2619)
- Child Resistant Packaging and Tactile Danger Warnings (Safety) (Revocation) Regulations 1992 (S.I. 1992/2620)
- Import and Export (Plant Health Fees) (Scotland) Order 1992 (S.I. 1992/2621)
- Education (Designated Institutions) (Wales) Order 1992 (S.I. 1992/2622)
- Customs Duties (ECSC) (Amendment No. 8) Order 1992 (S.I. 1992/2623)
- Sea Fish Licensing Order 1992 (S.I. 1992/2633)
- Seed Potatoes (Fees) (Scotland) (No.2) Regulations 1992 (S.I. 1992/2634)
- Child Support Commissioners (Procedure) Regulations 1992 (S.I. 1992/2640)
- Child Support Appeal Tribunals (Procedure) Regulations 1992 (S.I. 1992/2641)
- Finance (No. 2) Act 1992, section 62, (Commencement) Order 1992 (S.I. 1992/2642)
- Child Support (Collection and Enforcement of Other Forms of Maintenance) Regulations 1992 (S.I. 1992/2643)
- Child Support Act 1991 (Commencement No. 3 and Transitional Provisions) Order 1992 (S.I. 1992/2644)
- Child Support (Maintenance Arrangements and Jurisdiction) Regulations 1992 (S.I. 1992/2645)
- Gaming Act (Variation of Monetary Limits) (No. 3) Order 1992 (S.I. 1992/2646)
- Gaming Act (Variation of Monetary Limits) (No. 4) Order 1992 (S.I. 1992/2647)
- Gaming (Small Charges) Order 1992 (S.I. 1992/2648)
- Teachers' Superannuation (Additional Voluntary Contributions) (Scotland) Regulations 1992 (S.I. 1992/2649)
- M65 Motorway (Bamber Bridge to Whitebirk Section, Blackburn Southern Bypass) and Connecting Roads Scheme 1991 Variation Scheme 1992 (S.I. 1992/2651)
- Legal Advice and Assistance (Amendment) (No. 3) Regulations 1992 (S.I. 1992/2654)
- International Organisations (Miscellaneous Exemptions) Order 1992 (S.I. 1992/2655)
- Scottish Land Court Rules 1992 (S.I. 1992/2656)
- European Communities (Designation) (No. 3) Order 1992 (S.I. 1992/2661)
- Child Abduction and Custody (Parties to Conventions) (Amendment) (No. 4) Order 1992 (S.I. 1992/2662)
- European Convention on Extradition (Czech and Slovak Federative Republic) (Amendment) Order 1992 (S.I. 1992/2663)
- Judicial Committee (The Eastern Caribbean Supreme Court) Order 1992 (S.I. 1992/2664)
- Judicial Committee (Jamaica) Order 1992 (S.I. 1992/2665)
- Merchant Shipping (Confirmation of Legislation) (Cayman Islands) (No. 2) Order 1992 (S.I. 1992/2666)
- Merchant Shipping (Confirmation of Legislation) (Cayman Islands) (No. 3) Order 1992 (S.I. 1992/2667)
- Merchant Shipping (Prevention and Control of Pollution) (Bermuda) Order 1992 (S.I. 1992/2668)
- Consular Fees (Amendment) Order 1992 (S.I. 1992/2669)
- Criminal Justice Act 1982 (Isle of Man) Order 1992 (S.I. 1992/2670)
- Pharmaceutical Services (Northern Ireland) Order 1992 (S.I. 1992/2671)
- Patents, Designs and Marks (Chile, Gambia, Hong Kong, Italy, Japan, Lesotho and Swaziland) (Convention and Relevant Countries) Order 1992 (S.I. 1992/2672)
- Civil Aviation (Personnel Licences) Order 1992 (S.I. 1992/2673)
- Wildlife and Countryside Act 1981 (Variation of Schedule) (No. 2) Order 1992 (S.I. 1992/2674)
- A63 Trunk Road (Barnhill Lane, Howden Junction Improvement) Order 1992 (S.I. 1992/2675)
- Sheep Annual Premium Regulations 1992 (S.I. 1992/2677)
- International Carriage of Perishable Foodstuffs (Amendment) Regulations 1992 (S.I. 1992/2682)
- Town and Country Planning (Crown Land Applications) Regulations 1992 (S.I. 1992/2683)
- Medicines (Prohibition of Non-medicinal Antimicrobial Substances) (Amendment) Order 1992 (S.I. 1992/2684)

== 2701–2800 ==
- Broadgreen Hospital National Health Service Trust (Transfer of Trust Property) Order 1992 (S.I. 1992/2720)
- Cardiothoracic Centre — Liverpool National Health Service Trust (Transfer of Trust Property) Order 1992 (S.I. 1992/2721)
- Royal Liverpool University Hospital National Health Service Trust (Transfer of Trust Property) Order 1992 (S.I. 1992/2722)
- Royal Liverpool Children's Hospital and Community Services National Health Service Trust (Transfer of Trust Property) (No.2) Order 1992 (S.I. 1992/2723)
- Liverpool Obstetric and Gynaecology Services National Health Service Trust (Transfer of Trust Property) Order 1992 (S.I. 1992/2724)
- Food Protection (Emergency Prohibitions) (Lead in Ducks and Geese) (England) Order 1992 (S.I. 1992/2726)
- Gwent Community Health National Health Service Trust (Establishment) Order 1992 (S.I. 1992/2730)
- Wrexham Maelor Hospital National Health Service Trust (Establishment) Order 1992 (S.I. 1992/2731)
- Glan Clwyd District General Hospital National Health Service Trust (Establishment) Order 1992 (S.I. 1992/2732)
- Glan Hafren National Health Service Trust (Establishment) Order 1992 (S.I. 1992/2733)
- Llanelli Dinefwr National Health Service Trust (Establishment) Order 1992 (S.I. 1992/2734)
- Ceredigion and Mid Wales National Health Service Trust (Establishment) Order 1992 (S.I. 1992/2735)
- Swansea National Health Service Trust (Establishment) Order 1992 (S.I. 1992/2736)
- Llandough Hospital National Health Service Trust (Establishment) Order 1992 (S.I. 1992/2737)
- Bridgend and District National Health Service Trust (Establishment) Order 1992 (S.I. 1992/2738)
- Gofal Cymuned Clwydian Community Care National Health Service Trust (Establishment) Order 1992 (S.I. 1992/2739)
- South and East Wales Ambulance National Health Service Trust (Establishment) Order 1992 (S.I. 1992/2740)
- Powys Health Care National Health Service Trust (Establishment) Order 1992 (S.I. 1992/2741)
- Carmarthen and District National Health Service Trust (Establishment) Order 1992 (S.I. 1992/2742)
- Atomic Weapons Establishment (Designation and Appointed Day) Order 1992 (S.I. 1992/2743)
- Income Tax (Insurance Companies) (Expenses of Management) Regulations 1992 (S.I. 1992/2744)
- Finance Act 1985 (Interest on Tax) (Prescribed Rate) Order 1992 (S.I. 1992/2745)
- Mackerel (Specified Sea Areas) (Prohibition of Fishing) Order 1992 (S.I. 1992/2746)
- Building Societies (Aggregation) (Amendment) Rules 1992 (S.I. 1992/2748)
- River Ugie Salmon Fishery District (Baits and Lures) Regulations 1992 (S.I. 1992/2749)
- River Girvan Salmon Fishery District (Baits and Lures) Regulations 1992 (S.I. 1992/2750)
- National Health Service (Determination of Districts) (No. 4) Order 1992 (S.I. 1992/2751)
- National Health Service (District Health Authorities) (No. 4) Order 1992 (S.I. 1992/2752)
- Registration of Births and Deaths (Amendment) Regulations 1992 (S.I. 1992/2753)
- Gaming Act (Variation of Monetary Limits) (Scotland) (No. 2) Order 1992 (S.I. 1992/2754)
- Gaming (Small Charges) (Scotland) Order 1992 (S.I. 1992/2755)
- Criminal Appeal (Amendment) Rules 1992 (S.I. 1992/2757)
- Essex Ambulance Service National Health Service Trust (Transfer of Trust Property) Order 1992 (S.I. 1992/2758)
- Christie Hospital National Health Service Trust (Transfer of Trust Property) Order 1992 (S.I. 1992/2759)
- Mid Essex Hospital Services National Health Service Trust (Transfer of Trust Property) Order 1992 (S.I. 1992/2760)
- Kingston Hospital National Health Service Trust (Transfer of Trust Property) Order 1992 (S.I. 1992/2761)
- County Court Fees (Amendment) Order 1992 (S.I. 1992/2762)
- Milk and Dairies and Milk (Special Designation) (Charges) (Amendment) Regulations 1992 (S.I. 1992/2763)
- Blue Eared Pig Disease (Revocation) Order 1992 (S.I. 1992/2764)
- Food Safety Act 1990 (Consequential Modifications) (Local Enactments) (No. 2) Order 1992 (S.I. 1992/2766)
- Cigarettes (Maximum Tar Yield) (Safety) Regulations 1992 (S.I. 1992/2783)
- Transport and Works Act 1992 (Commencement No. 3 and Transitional Provisions) Order 1992 (S.I. 1992/2784)
- Transport Levying Bodies Regulations 1992 (S.I. 1992/2789)
- Statistics of Trade (Customs and Excise) Regulations 1992 (S.I. 1992/2790)
- Health and Safety (Display Screen Equipment) Regulations 1992 (S.I. 1992/2792)
- Manual Handling Operations Regulations 1992 (S.I. 1992/2793)
- Council Tax (Exempt Dwellings) (Scotland) Amendment Order 1992 (S.I. 1992/2796)

== 2801–2900 ==
- Police and Criminal Evidence Act 1984 (Commencement No. 5) Order 1992 (SI 1992/2802)
- Police and Criminal Evidence Act 1984 (Tape-recording of Interviews) (No. 2) Order 1992 (SI 1992/2803)
- Income Support (General) Amendment (No. 3) Regulations 1992 (SI 1992/2804)
- A423 North of Oxford-South of Coventry Trunk Road (Kidlington to Cutteslowe Section) De-Trunking Order 1992 (SI 1992/2805)
- A43 Oxford-Market Deeping Trunk Road (Peartree Hill Roundabout to Gosford Section) De-Trunking Order 1992 (SI 1992/2806)
- Cheshire County Council (Arpley New Bridge, Warrington) Scheme 1989 Confirmation Instrument 1992 (SI 1992/2808)
- A47 Trunk Road (Walpole Highway and Tilney High End Bypass and Slip Roads) Order 1992 (SI 1992/2809)
- A47 Trunk Road (Walpole Highway and Tilney High End Bypass Detrunking) Order 1992 (SI 1992/2810)
- Smoke Control Areas (Exempted Fireplaces) Order 1992 (SI 1992/2811)
- Smallholdings (Full-Time Employment) (Amendment) Regulations 1992 (S.I. 1992/2816)
- Transport and Works (Inquiries Procedure) Rules 1992 (SI 1992/2817)
- Taxes (Interest Rate) (Amendment No.5) Regulations 1992 (SI 1992/2818)
- Local Authorities (Capital Finance) (Amendment) (No. 3) Regulations 1992 (SI 1992/2819)
- Passenger Transport Executives (Capital Finance) (Temporary Provision) Order 1992 (SI 1992/2820)
- Firearms (Scotland) Amendment Rules 1992 (SI 1992/2821)
- Haddock (Specified Sea Areas) (Prohibition of Fishing) (No. 2) Order 1992 (SI 1992/2822)
- Firearms Acts (Amendment) Regulations 1992 (SI 1992/2823)
- Firearms (Amendment) Rules 1992 (SI 1992/2824)
- Local Authorities (Goods and Services) (Public Bodies) Order 1992 (SI 1992/2830)
- Planning and Compensation Act 1991 (Commencement No. 14 and Transitional Provision) Order 1992 (SI 1992/2831)
- Town and Country Planning (Modification and Discharge of Planning Obligations) Regulations 1992 (SI 1992/2832)
- Estate Agents (Specified Offences) (No. 2) (Amendment) Order 1992 (SI 1992/2833)
- Property Misdescriptions (Specified Matters) Order 1992 (SI 1992/2834)
- Savings Certificates (Amendment) Regulations 1992 (SI 1992/2835)
- Aintree Hospitals National Health Service Trust (Transfer of Trust Property) Order 1992 (SI 1992/2836)
- East Somerset National Health Service Trust (Transfer of Trust Property) Order 1992 (SI 1992/2837)
- Mersey Regional Ambulance Service National Health Service Trust (Transfer of Trust Property) Order 1992 (SI 1992/2838)
- North Mersey Community National Health Service Trust (Transfer of Trust Property) Order 1992 (SI 1992/2839)
- Taunton and Somerset National Health Service Trust (Transfer of Trust Property) Order 1992 (SI 1992/2840)
- Walton Centre for Neurology and Neurosurgery National Health Service Trust (Transfer of Trust Property) Order 1992 (SI 1992/2841)
- Road Traffic Offenders (Prescribed Devices) (No. 2) Order 1992 (SI 1992/2843)
- Medicines (Exemption from Licensing) (Radiopharmaceuticals) Order 1992 (SI 1992/2844)
- Medicines (Manufacturer's Undertakings for Imported Products) Amendment Regulations 1992 (SI 1992/2845)
- Medicines (Standard Provisions for Licences and Certificates) Amendment Regulations 1992 (SI 1992/2846)
- Hake (Specified Sea Areas) (Prohibition of Fishing) Order 1992 (S.I. 1992/2847)
- Offshore Installations (Safety Zones) (No. 4) Order 1992 (SI 1992/2852)
- Insurance Brokers Registration Council (Indemnity Insurance and Grants Scheme) (Amendment) Rules Approval Order 1992 (SI 1992/2866)
- Closure of Prisons (H.M. Young Offender Institution Lowdham Grange) Order 1992 (SI 1992/2867)
- Value Added Tax (General) (Amendment) (No. 3) Regulations 1992 (SI 1992/2868)
- Social Security (Disability Living Allowance and Attendance Allowance) (Amendment) Regulations 1992 (SI 1992/2869)
- European Communities (Designation) (No. 4) Order 1992 (SI 1992/2870)
- European Communities (Definition of Treaties) (Europe Agreement establishing an Association between the European Communities and their Member States and the Republic of Hungary) Order 1992 (SI 1992/2871)
- European Communities (Definition of Treaties) (Europe Agreement establishing an Association between the European Communities and their Member States and the Republic of Poland) Order 1992 (SI 1992/2872)
- Criminal Justice (International Co-operation) Act 1990 (Modification) Order 1992 (SI 1992/2873)
- Legal Advice and Assistance (Scope) (Amendment) Regulations 1992 (SI 1992/2874)
- Telecommunications (Single Emergency Call Number) Regulations 1992 (SI 1992/2875)
- Companies (Fees) (Amendment) Regulations 1992 (SI 1992/2876)
- Faculty Jurisdiction Rules 1992 (SI 1992/2882)
- Ecclesiastical Judges and Legal Officers (Fees) Order 1992 (SI 1992/2883)
- Faculty Jurisdiction (Injunctions and Restoration Orders) Rules 1992 (SI 1992/2884)
- Offshore Installations (Safety Case) Regulations 1992 (SI 1992/2885)
- Insurance Companies (Amendment) Regulations 1992 (SI 1992/2890)
- Premium Savings Bonds (Amendment) Regulations 1992 (SI 1992/2891)
- National Savings Bank (Amendment) Regulations 1992 (SI 1992/2892)

== 2901–3000 ==
- Transport and Works (Applications and Objections Procedure) Rules 1992 (S.I. 1992/2902)
- Levying Bodies (General) Regulations 1992 (S.I. 1992/2903)
- Local Authorities (Calculation of Council Tax Base) (Supply of Information) Regulations 1992 (S.I. 1992/2904)
- National Health Service Trusts (Consultation on Dissolution) Amendment Regulations 1992 (S.I. 1992/2905)
- Motor Vehicles (Type Approval) (Great Britain) (Amendment) (No. 3) Regulations 1992 (S.I. 1992/2908)
- Road Vehicles (Construction and Use) (Amendment) (No. 6) Regulations 1992 (S.I. 1992/2909)
- Social Security (Unemployment, Sickness and Invalidity Benefit) Amendment Regulations 1992 (S.I. 1992/2913)
- Controlled Drugs (Substances Useful for Manufacture) (Amendment) Regulations 1992 (S.I. 1992/2914)
- Income Tax (Building Societies) (Dividends and Interest) (Amendment No. 2) Regulations 1992 (S.I. 1992/2915)
- A69 Trunk Road (Brampton Bypass Link Road) (De-Trunking) Order 1992 (S.I. 1992/2916)
- Suckler Cow Premium (Amendment No. 3) Regulations 1992 (S.I. 1992/2918)
- Meat Hygiene Appeals Tribunal (Procedure) Regulations 1992 (S.I. 1992/2921)
- A59 Preston New Road (Samlesbury) Order 1992 (S.I. 1992/2922)
- Borough of Ynys Môn—Isle of Anglesey (Electoral Arrangements) Order 1992 (S.I. 1992/2923)
- Local Authorities (Funds) (Wales) Regulations 1992 (S.I. 1992/2929)
- Building Societies (Liquid Asset) (Amendment) Regulations 1992 (S.I. 1992/2930)
- Building Societies (Limits on Lending) Order 1992 (S.I. 1992/2931)
- Provision and Use of Work Equipment Regulations 1992 (S.I. 1992/2932)
- National Health Service (General Medical and Pharmaceutical Services) (Scotland) Amendment (No. 3) Regulations 1992 (S.I. 1992/2933)
- Water Byelaws (Milngavie Waterworks, Loch Katrine, Loch Arklet, Glen Finglas) Extension Order 1992 (S.I. 1992/2934)
- Sea Fishing (Enforcement of Community Conservation Measures) (Amendment) (No. 5) Order 1992 (S.I. 1992/2936)
- Medicines (Products Other Than Veterinary Drugs) (Prescription Only) Amendment (No. 2) Order 1992 (S.I. 1992/2937)
- Medicines (Sale or Supply) (Miscellaneous Provisions) Amendment Regulations 1992 (S.I. 1992/2938)
- Medicines (Pharmacies) (Applications for Registration and Fees) Amendment Regulations 1992 (S.I. 1992/2939)
- Council Tax (Exempt Dwellings) (Amendment) Order 1992 (S.I. 1992/2941)
- Council Tax (Additional Provisions for Discount Disregards) (Amendment) Regulations 1992 (S.I. 1992/2942)
- Local Authorities (Calculation of Council Tax Base) (Amendment) (No. 2) Regulations 1992 (S.I. 1992/2943)
- British Railways (Penalty Fares) Act 1989 (Activating No. 7) Order 1992 (S.I. 1992/2945)
- County Council of Norfolk (River Wissey Bridge) Scheme 1992 Confirmation Instrument 1992 (S.I. 1992/2953)
- Gaming Machine Licence Duty (Variation of Monetary Limits and Exemptions) Order 1992 (S.I. 1992/2954)
- Council Tax (Dwellings and Part Residential Subjects) (Scotland) Regulations 1992 (S.I. 1992/2955)
- Costs in Criminal Cases (General) (Amendment) (No. 2) Regulations 1992 (S.I. 1992/2956)
- River Roach Oyster Fishery Order 1992 (S.I. 1992/2957)
- Electricity Supply (Amendment) Regulations 1992 (S.I. 1992/2961)
- Newport—Shrewsbury Trunk Road (A4042) (Llantarnam By-Pass) Order 1992 (S.I. 1992/2962)
- Mackerel (Specified Sea Areas) (Prohibition of Fishing) (No. 2) Order 1992 (S.I. 1992/2963)
- Act of Sederunt (Proceedings in the Sheriff Court under the Debtors (Scotland) Act 1987) (Amendment) 1992 (S.I. 1992/2964)
- Personal Protective Equipment at Work Regulations 1992 (S.I. 1992/2966)
- Leeds City Council (Crown Point Bridge Improvement) Scheme 1992 Confirmation Instrument 1992 (S.I. 1992/2967)
- Fire Services (Appointments and Promotion) (Scotland) Amendment (No.2) Regulations 1992 (S.I. 1992/2971)
- Child Benefit (Residence and Persons Abroad) Amendment Regulations 1992 (S.I. 1992/2972)
- Health and Social Services and Social Security Adjudications Act 1983 (Commencement No. 6) Order 1992 (S.I. 1992/2974)
- National Health Service and Community Care Act 1990 (Commencement No. 10) Order 1992 (S.I. 1992/2975)
- Community Care (Residential Accommodation) Act 1992 (Commencement) Order 1992 (S.I. 1992/2976)
- National Assistance (Assessment of Resources) Regulations 1992 (S.I. 1992/2977)
- Occupational Pensions (Revaluation) Order 1992 (S.I. 1992/2978)
- Finance (No. 2) Act 1992 (Commencement No. 2 and Transitional Provisions) Order 1992 (S.I. 1992/2979)
- Charities (Qualified Surveyors' Reports) Regulations 1992 (S.I. 1992/2980)
- Registration of Births, Deaths and Marriages (Fees) (No. 2) Order 1992 (S.I. 1992/2982)
- New Roads and Street Works Act 1991 (Commencement No. 5 and Transitional Provisions and Savings) Order 1992 (S.I. 1992/2984)
- Street Works (Registers, Notices, Directions and Designations) Regulations 1992 (S.I. 1992/2985)
- Charity Commissioners' Fees (Copies and Extracts) Regulations 1992 (S.I. 1992/2986)
- New Roads and Street Works Act 1991 (Commencement No.6 and Transitional Provisions and Savings) (Scotland) Order 1992 (S.I. 1992/2990)
- Road Works (Registers, Notices, Directions and Designations) (Scotland) Regulations 1992 (S.I. 1992/2991)
- Licensing of Air Carriers Regulations 1992 (S.I. 1992/2992)
- Access for Community Air Carriers to Intra- Community Air Routes Regulations 1992 (S.I. 1992/2993)
- Air Fares Regulations 1992 (S.I. 1992/2994)
- Local Government Act 1988 (Defined Activities) (Exemption) (Staffordshire Moorlands District Council) Order 1992 (S.I. 1992/2995)
- Local Government Finance (Payments) (English Authorities) Regulations 1992 (S.I. 1992/2996)
- Public Information for Radiation Emergencies Regulations 1992 (S.I. 1992/2997)

== 3001–3100 ==
- Education (Further Education Corporations) (No. 3) Order 1992 (S.I. 1992/3001)
- Social Security (Claims and Payments) Amendment (No. 2) Regulations 1992 (S.I. 1992/3002)
- Companies Act 1985 (Amendment of Sections 250 and 251) Regulations 1992 (S.I. 1992/3003)
- Workplace (Health, Safety and Welfare) Regulations 1992 (S.I. 1992/3004)
- Land Registration (Charities) Rules 1992 (S.I. 1992/3005)
- Companies (Forms) (Amendment) Regulations 1992 (S.I. 1992/3006)
- Council Tax (Administration and Enforcement) (Amendment) Regulations 1992 (S.I. 1992/3008)
- Local Government Act 1988 (Defined Activities) (Exemption) (Stockport Borough Council) Order 1992 (S.I. 1992/3009)
- Wildlife and Countryside Act 1981 (Variation of Schedules 2 and 3) Order 1992 (S.I. 1992/3010)
- Port of London Authority Harbour Revision Order 1992 (S.I. 1992/3011)
- Road Traffic (Courses for Drink-Drive Offenders) Regulations 1992 (S.I. 1992/3013)
- Courses for Drink-Drive Offenders (Designation of Areas) Order 1992 (S.I. 1992/3014)
- Finance Act 1985 (Interest on Tax) (Prescribed Rate) (No. 2) Order 1992 (S.I. 1992/3015)
- Gaming Act (Variation of Monetary Limits) (Scotland) (No.3) Order 1992 (S.I. 1992/3022)
- Council Tax (Prescribed Class of Dwellings) (Wales) Regulations 1992 (S.I. 1992/3023)
- Local Government (District Council Tax) (Scotland) Regulations 1992 (S.I. 1992/3024)
- Local Government Superannuation (Scotland) Amendment Regulations 1992 (S.I. 1992/3025)
- Cambridgeshire and Suffolk (County Boundaries) Order 1992 (S.I. 1992/3026)
- Bass (Specified Areas) (Prohibition of Fishing) (Variation) Order 1992 (S.I. 1992/3027)
- Combined Probation Areas (West Yorkshire) Order 1992 (S.I. 1992/3028)
- Motor Vehicles (Compulsory Insurance) Regulations 1992 (S.I. 1992/3036)
- Weighing Equipment (Non-automatic Weighing Machines) (Amendment) Regulations 1992 (S.I. 1992/3037)
- Wash Fishery Order 1992 (S.I. 1992/3038)
- Civil Aviation (Joint Financing) (Fourth Amendment) Regulations 1992 (S.I. 1992/3039)
- Civil Aviation (Route Charges for Navigation Services) (Fifth Amendment) Regulations 1992 (S.I. 1992/3040)
- Social Security Benefit (Dependency) Amendment Regulations 1992 (S.I. 1992/3041)
- Construction Plant and Equipment (Harmonisation of Noise Emission Standards) (Extension to Northern Ireland) Regulations 1992 (S.I. 1992/3043)
- Horses (Free Access to Competitions) Regulations 1992 (S.I. 1992/3044)
- Horses (Zootechnical Standards) Regulations 1992 (S.I. 1992/3045)
- National Health Service (Superannuation, Premature Retirement and Injury Benefits) (Scotland) Amendment Regulations 1992 (S.I. 1992/3046)
- Police Cadets (Scotland) Amendment (No.2) Regulations 1992 (S.I. 1992/3047)
- Industrial Training (Construction Board) Order 1964 (Amendment) Order 1992 (SI 1992/3048)
- Public Lending Right Scheme 1982 (Commencement of Variation) Order 1992 (S.I. 1992/3049)
- Durham, Northumberland and Tyne and Wear (County and District Boundaries) Order 1992 (S.I. 1992/3050)
- Town and Country Planning (Fees for Applications and Deemed Applications) (Amendment) (No. 2) Regulations 1992 (S.I. 1992/3052)
- Street Works (Notices) Order 1992 (S.I. 1992/3053)
- Durham and Tyne and Wear (County and District Boundaries) Order 1992 (S.I. 1992/3054)
- Northumberland and Tyne and Wear (County and District Boundaries) Order 1992 (S.I. 1992/3055)
- Public Airport Companies (Capital Finance) (Third Amendment) Order 1992 (S.I. 1992/3056)
- Further and Higher Education Act 1992 (Commencement No. 2) Order 1992 (S.I. 1992/3057)
- Animals (Scientific Procedures) Act (Fees) Order 1992 (S.I. 1992/3058)
- Local Government Act 1988 (Defined Activities) (Competition) (Tunbridge Wells Borough Council) Regulations 1992 (S.I. 1992/3059)
- Railways Regulations 1992 (S.I. 1992/3060)
- Non-Domestic Rating Contributions (Scotland) Regulations 1992 (S.I. 1992/3061)
- Road Works (Reinstatement) (Scotland) Amendment Regulations 1992 (S.I. 1992/3062)
- Road Works (Notices) (Scotland) Order 1992 (S.I. 1992/3063)
- Education (University Commissioners) Order 1992 (S.I. 1992/3064)
- Value Added Tax (Motor Vehicles for the Handicapped) Order 1992 (S.I. 1992/3065)
- Corporation Tax Acts (Provisions for Payment of Tax and Returns) (Appointed Days) Order 1992 (S.I. 1992/3066)
- Asbestos (Prohibitions) Regulations 1992 (S.I. 1992/3067)
- Control of Asbestos at Work (Amendment) Regulations 1992 (S.I. 1992/3068)
- School Teachers' Remuneration, Professional Duties and Working Time Order 1992 (S.I. 1992/3069)
- School Teachers' Pay and Conditions Act 1991 (Commencement No. 4) Order 1992 (S.I. 1992/3070)
- Civil Courts (Amendment No. 4) Order 1992 (S.I. 1992/3071)
- Public Record Office (Fees) Regulations 1992 (S.I. 1992/3072)
- Supply of Machinery (Safety) Regulations 1992 (S.I. 1992/3073)
- Overhead Lines (Exemption) Regulations 1992 (S.I. 1992/3074)
- Companies (Summary Financial Statement) Regulations 1992 (S.I. 1992/3075)
- Gaming (Bingo) Act (Variation of Monetary Limit) Order 1992 (S.I. 1992/3076)
- Goods Vehicles (Community Authorisations) Regulations 1992 (S.I. 1992/3077)
- Forest Reproductive Material (Amendment) Regulations 1992 (S.I. 1992/3078)
- Internal Drainage Boards (Finance) Regulations 1992 (S.I. 1992/3079)
- Medicines (Veterinary Drugs) (Pharmacy and Merchants' List) (Amendment) Order 1992 (S.I. 1992/3081)
- Non-Domestic Rating Contributions (England) Regulations 1992 (S.I. 1992/3082)
- Local Government Superannuation (Remuneration) Regulations 1992 (S.I. 1992/3083)
- Motor Vehicles (Type Approval for Goods Vehicles) (Great Britain) (Amendment) (No. 3) Regulations 1992 (S.I. 1992/3084)
- Motor Vehicles (Driving Licences) (Heavy Goods and Public Service Vehicles) (Amendment) Regulations 1992 (S.I. 1992/3085)
- Motor Vehicles (Designation of Approval Marks) (Amendment) (No. 2) Regulations 1992 (S.I. 1992/3086)
- Motor Vehicles Tyres (Safety) (Amendment) Regulations 1992 (S.I. 1992/3087)
- Road Vehicles (Construction and Use) (Amendment) (No. 7) Regulations 1992 (S.I. 1992/3088)
- Motor Vehicles (Driving Licences) (Large Goods and Passenger-Carrying Vehicles) (Amendment) (No. 5) Regulations 1992 (S.I. 1992/3089)
- Motor Vehicles (Driving Licences) (Amendment) (No. 4) Regulations 1992 (S.I. 1992/3090)
- Patents (Supplementary Protection Certificate for Medicinal Products) Regulations 1992 (S.I. 1992/3091)
- Export of Goods (Control) Order 1992 (S.I. 1992/3092)
- Non-automatic Weighing Instruments (EEC Requirements) (Fees) Regulations 1992 (S.I. 1992/3093)
- Child Support Fees Regulations 1992 (S.I. 1992/3094)
- Customs and Excise (Single Market etc.) Regulations 1992 (S.I. 1992/3095)
- Value Added Tax (EC Sales Statements) Regulations 1992 (S.I. 1992/3096)
- Value Added Tax (Accounting and Records) (Amendment) Regulations 1992 (S.I. 1992/3097)
- Value Added Tax (Repayment to Community Traders) (Amendment) Regulations 1992 (S.I. 1992/3098)
- Value Added Tax (Valuation of Acquisitions) Regulations 1992 (S.I. 1992/3099)
- Value Added Tax (Refunds in relation to New Means of Transport) Regulations 1992 (S.I. 1992/3100)

== 3101–3200 ==
- Value Added Tax (Removal of Goods) (Accounting) Regulations 1992 (S.I. 1992/3101)
- Value Added Tax (General) (Amendment) (No. 4) Regulations 1992 (S.I. 1992/3102)
- Value Added Tax (Flat-rate Scheme for Farmers) Regulations 1992 (S.I. 1992/3103)
- Finance (No. 2) Act 1992 (Commencement No. 3) Order 1992 (S.I. 1992/3104)
- Road Traffic Act 1988 (Amendment) Regulations 1992 (S.I. 1992/3105)
- Gloucestershire Airport (Designation) (Detention and Sale of Aircraft) Order 1992 (S.I. 1992/3106)
- Motor Vehicles (EC Type Approval) Regulations 1992 (S.I. 1992/3107)
- Fishing Boats (European Economic Community) Designation (Variation) Order 1992 (S.I. 1992/3108)
- Local Government Act 1988 (Defined Activities) (Exemption) (Kettering Borough Council) Order 1992 (S.I. 1992/3109)
- Street Works (Reinstatement) (Amendment) Regulations 1992 (S.I. 1992/3110)
- Value Added Tax (Removal of Goods) Order 1992 (S.I. 1992/3111)
- Savings Contract (Amendment) Regulations 1992 (S.I. 1992/3112)
- Savings Certificates (Children's Bonus Bonds) (Amendment) Regulations 1992 (S.I. 1992/3113)
- Savings Certificates (Yearly Plan) (Amendment) Regulations 1992 (S.I. 1992/3114)
- Savings Certificates (Amendment) (No. 2) Regulations 1992 (S.I. 1992/3115)
- Premium Savings Bonds (Amendment) (No.2) Regulations 1992 (S.I. 1992/3116)
- Friendly Societies Act 1992 (Commencement No. 2) Order 1992 (S.I. 1992/3117)
- Value Added Tax (Small Non-Commercial Consignments) Relief (Amendment) Order 1992 (S.I. 1992/3118)
- Value Added Tax (Temporarily Imported Goods and Goods Imported for Private Purposes) Reliefs (Revocation) Order 1992 (S.I. 1992/3119)
- Value Added Tax (Imported Goods) Relief (Amendment) Order 1992 (S.I. 1992/3120)
- Value Added Tax (Place of Supply of Services) Order 1992 (S.I. 1992/3121)
- Value Added Tax (Cars) Order 1992 (S.I. 1992/3122)
- Value Added Tax (Input Tax) (Specified Supplies) Order 1992 (S.I. 1992/3123)
- Value Added Tax (Imported Gold) Relief Order 1992 (S.I. 1992/3124)
- Value Added Tax (Tour Operators) (Amendment) Order 1992 (S.I. 1992/3125)
- Value Added Tax (Transport) Order 1992 (S.I. 1992/3126)
- Value Added Tax (Means of Transport) Order 1992 (S.I. 1992/3127)
- Value Added Tax (Reverse Charge) Order 1992 (S.I. 1992/3128)
- Value Added Tax (Special Provisions) Order 1992 (S.I. 1992/3129)
- Value Added Tax (Supply of Temporarily Imported Goods) Order 1992 (S.I. 1992/3130)
- Value Added Tax (Tax Free Shops) Order 1992 (S.I. 1992/3131)
- Value Added Tax (Treatment of Transactions) (No.2) Order 1992 (S.I. 1992/3132)
- Income Tax (Definition of Unit Trust Scheme) (Amendment No. 2) Regulations 1992 (S.I. 1992/3133)
- Tobacco for Oral Use (Safety) Regulations 1992 (S.I. 1992/3134)
- Excise Goods (Holding, Movement, Warehousing and REDS) Regulations 1992 (S.I. 1992/3135)
- Milk and Dairies (Standardisation and Importation) (Scotland) Regulations 1992 (S.I. 1992/3136)
- Town and Country Planning (Fees for Applications and Deemed Applications) (Scotland) Amendment (No.2) Regulations 1992 (S.I. 1992/3137)
- Transport and Works Applications (Listed Buildings, Conservation Areas and Ancient Monuments Procedure) Regulations 1992 (S.I. 1992/3138)
- Personal Protective Equipment (EC Directive) Regulations 1992 (S.I. 1992/3139)
- Education (National Curriculum) (Attainment Targets and Programmes of Study in Welsh) (Amendment) (No. 2) Order 1992 (S.I. 1992/3140)
- Agricultural Wages Committees (Areas) (England) Order 1992 (S.I. 1992/3141)
- Milk Marketing Schemes (Amendment) (Standardisation) Regulations 1992 (S.I. 1992/3142)
- Milk and Dairies (Standardisation and Importation) Regulations 1992 (S.I. 1992/3143)
- Transport and Works Act 1992 (Commencement No. 4) Order 1992 (S.I. 1992/3144)
- Plastic Materials and Articles in Contact with Food Regulations 1992 (S.I. 1992/3145)
- Active Implantable Medical Devices Regulations 1992 (S.I. 1992/3146)
- Social Security Benefits (Amendments Consequential Upon the Introduction of Community Care) Regulations 1992 (S.I. 1992/3147)
- Smoke Control Areas (Authorised Fuels) (Amendment) (No. 2) Regulations 1992 (S.I. 1992/3148)
- Hydrocarbon Oil (Amendment) Regulations 1992 (S.I. 1992/3149)
- Revenue Traders (Accounts and Records) Regulations 1992 (S.I. 1992/3150)
- Excise Goods (Drawback) Regulations 1992 (S.I. 1992/3151)
- Excise Duties (Deferred Payment) Regulations 1992 (S.I. 1992/3152)
- Value Added Tax (Repayments to Third Country Traders) (Amendment) Regulations 1992 (S.I. 1992/3153)
- Tobacco Products (Amendment) Regulations 1992 (S.I. 1992/3154)
- Excise Duties (Personal Reliefs) Order 1992 (S.I. 1992/3155)
- Customs and Excise (Personal Reliefs for Special Visitors) Order 1992 (S.I. 1992/3156)
- Excise Duty (Relief on Alcoholic Ingredients) (Amendments) Regulations 1992 (S.I. 1992/3157)
- Excise Duty (Amendment of the Alcoholic Liquor Duties Act 1979 and the Hydrocarbon Oil Duties Act 1979) Regulations 1992 (S.I. 1992/3158)
- Specified Diseases (Notification and Slaughter) Order 1992 (S.I. 1992/3159)
- Motor Vehicles (Tests) (Amendment) (No. 3) Regulations 1992 (S.I. 1992/3160)
- Artificial Insemination of Pigs (EEC) Regulations 1992 (S.I. 1992/3161)
- Patents (Supplementary Protection Certificate for Medicinal Products) Rules 1992 (S.I. 1992/3162)
- Food Safety (Fishery Products) Regulations 1992 (S.I. 1992/3163)
- Food Safety (Live Bivalve Molluscs and Other Shellfish) Regulations 1992 (S.I. 1992/3164)
- Food Safety (Fishery Products on Fishing Vessels) Regulations 1992 (S.I. 1992/3165)
- Combined Probation Areas (Warwickshire) Order 1992 (S.I. 1992/3166)
- Taxes (Interest Rate) (Amendment No. 6) Regulations 1992 (S.I. 1992/3167)
- Education (Individual Pupils' Achievements) (Information) Regulations 1992 (S.I. 1992/3168)
- Combined Probation Areas (Hampshire) Order 1992 (S.I. 1992/3169)
- Police (Scotland) Amendment (No.2) Regulations 1992 (S.I. 1992/3170)
- Non-Domestic Ratepayers (Consultation) Regulations 1992 (S.I. 1992/3171)
- Employers' Liability (Compulsory Insurance) Exemption (Amendment) Regulations 1992 (S.I. 1992/3172)
- Farm and Conservation Grant (Amendment) Regulations 1992 (S.I. 1992/3174)
- Farm Business Non-Capital Grant (Amendment) Scheme 1992 (S.I. 1992/3175)
- Housing (Change of Landlord) (Payment of Disposal Cost by Instalments) (Amendment) (No. 3) Regulations 1992 (S.I. 1992/3176)
- Ashford Hospitals National Health Service Trust (Change of Name) Order 1992 (S.I. 1992/3177)
- Companies Act 1985 (Disclosure of Branches and Bank Accounts) Regulations 1992 (S.I. 1992/3178)
- Oversea Companies and Credit and Financial Institutions (Branch Disclosure) Regulations 1992 (S.I. 1992/3179)
- Income Tax (Employments) (No. 23) Regulations 1992 (S.I. 1992/3180)
- Inheritance Tax (Market Makers) Regulations 1992 (S.I. 1992/3181)
- Residential Accommodation (Determination of District Health Authority) Regulations 1992 (S.I. 1992/3182)
- Acquisition of Land (Rate of Interest after Entry) Regulations 1992 (S.I. 1992/3183)
- Food Protection (Emergency Prohibitions) (Dioxins) (England) (No.2) (Revocation) Order 1992 (S.I. 1992/3188)
- Imitation Dummies (Safety) Regulations 1992 (S.I. 1992/3189)
- Customs Duty (Personal Reliefs) (Amendment) Order 1992 (S.I. 1992/3192)
- Customs and Excise Duties (Personal Reliefs for Goods Permanently Imported) Order 1992 Approved by the House of Commons S.I. 1992/3193)
- Social Security (Overlapping Benefits) Amendment (No. 2) Regulations 1992 (S.I. 1992/3194)
- European Communities (Designation) (No. 5) Order 1992 (S.I. 1992/3197)
- Air Navigation (Overseas Territories) (Amendment) Order 1992 (S.I. 1992/3198)
- Child Abduction and Custody (Parties to Conventions) (Amendment) (No. 5) Order 1992 (S.I. 1992/3199)
- Extradition (Hijacking) Order 1992 (S.I. 1992/3200)

== 3201–3300 ==
- Merchant Shipping (Conformation of Legislation) (Virgin Islands) Order 1992 (S.I. 1992/3201)
- Criminal Justice Act 1982 (Guernsey) Order 1992 (S.I. 1992/3202)
- Private Streets (Amendment) (Northern Ireland) Order 1992 (S.I. 1992/3203)
- Registered Homes (Northern Ireland) Order 1992 (S.I. 1992/3204)
- Wireless Telegraphy Appeal Tribunal (Isle of Man) Order 1992 (S.I. 1992/3205)
- Double Taxation Relief (Taxes on Income) (Falkland Islands) Order 1992 (S.I. 1992/3206)
- Double Taxation Relief (Taxes on Income) (Guyana) Order 1992 (S.I. 1992/3207)
- Naval, Military and Air Forces etc. (Disablement and Death) Service Pensions Amendment (No.2) Order 1992 (S.I. 1992/3208)
- Social Security (Austria) Order 1992 (S.I. 1992/3209)
- Social Security (Finland) Order 1992 (S.I. 1992/3210)
- Social Security (Iceland) Order 1992 (S.I. 1992/3211)
- Social Security (Norway) Order 1992 (S.I. 1992/3212)
- Social Security (Sweden) Order 1992 (S.I. 1992/3213)
- Marriage Fees (Scotland) Regulations 1992 (S.I. 1992/3214)
- Registration of Births, Deaths, Marriages and Divorces (Fees) (Scotland) Regulations 1992 (S.I. 1992/3215)
- Registration of Births, Deaths and Marriages (Fees) (Scotland) Order 1992 (S.I. 1992/3216)
- Genetically Modified Organisms (Contained Use) Regulations 1992 (S.I. 1992/3217)
- Banking Coordination (Second Council Directive) Regulations 1992 (S.I. 1992/3218)
- Income Tax (Interest Relief) (Qualifying Lenders) (No. 2) Order 1992 (S.I. 1992/3219)
- Value Added Tax (Flat-rate Scheme for Farmers) (Designated Activities) Order 1992 (S.I. 1992/3220)
- Value Added Tax (Flat-rate Scheme for Farmers) (Percentage Addition) Order 1992 (S.I. 1992/3221)
- Value Added Tax (Input Tax) Order 1992 (S.I. 1992/3222)
- Value Added Tax (International Services and Transport) Order 1992 (S.I. 1992/3223)
- Postal Packets (Customs and Excise) (Amendment) Regulations 1992 (S.I. 1992/3224)
- Acquisition of Land (Rate of Interest after Entry) (Scotland) (No. 2) Regulations 1992 (S.I. 1992/3225)
- Personal Injuries (Civilians) Amendment (No.2) Scheme 1992 (S.I. 1992/3226)
- Children and Young Persons (Protection from Tobacco) Act 1991 (Commencement No.3) Order 1992 (S.I. 1992/3227)
- Protection from Tobacco (Display of Warning Statements) Regulations 1992 (S.I. 1992/3228)
- Local Government Superannuation (Merseyside Transport Limited) Regulations 1992 (S.I. 1992/3229)
- Transport and Works (Descriptions of Works Interfering with Navigation) Order 1992 (S.I. 1992/3230)
- Transport and Works (Guided Transport Modes) Order 1992 (S.I. 1992/3231)
- Mallaig Harbour Revision Order 1992 (S.I. 1992/3232)
- Copyright (Computer Programs) Regulations 1992 (S.I. 1992/3233)
- Income Tax (Prescribed Deposit-takers) Order 1992 (S.I. 1992/3234)
- Plant Health (Forestry) (Great Britain) (Amendment) Order 1992 (S.I. 1992/3235)
- Aflatoxins in Nuts, Nut Products, Dried Figs and Dried Fig Products Regulations 1992 (S.I. 1992/3236)
- Education (Grants) (Higher Education Corporations) Regulations 1992 (S.I. 1992/3237)
- Non-Domestic Rating Contributions (Wales) Regulations 1992 (S.I. 1992/3238)
- Billing Authorities (Anticipation of Precepts) Regulations 1992 (S.I. 1992/3239)
- Environmental Information Regulations 1992 Approved by both Houses of Parliament S.I. 1992/3240)
- Local Government Act 1992 (Commencement No.2) Order 1992 (S.I. 1992/3241)
- Disposal of Records (Scotland) Regulations 1992 (S.I. 1992/3247)
- Environmental Protection Act 1990 (Commencement No. 12) Order 1992 (S.I. 1992/3253)
- Act of Sederunt (Commissary Court Books) 1992 (S.I. 1992/3256)
- Local Authorities (Capital Finance) (Amendment) (No. 4) Regulations 1992 (S.I. 1992/3257)
- Non—Domestic Rating Contributions (England) (Amendment) Regulations 1992 (S.I. 1992/3259)
- Finance (No. 2) Act 1992 (Commencement No. 4 and Transitional Provisions) Order 1992 (S.I. 1992/3261)
- Haddock and Hake (Specified Sea Areas) (Prohibition of Fishing) Order 1992 (S.I. 1992/3262)
- Sole (Specified Sea Areas) (Prohibition of Fishing) Order 1992 (S.I. 1992/3266)
- Firearms (Northern Ireland) Order 1981 (Amendment) Regulations 1992 (S.I. 1992/3267)
- Combined Probation Areas (West Yorkshire) (Amendment) Order 1992 (S.I. 1992/3268)
- Whiting (Specified Sea Areas) (Prohibition of Fishing) Order 1992 (S.I. 1992/3269)
- Transport and Works (Model Clauses for Railways and Tramways) Order 1992 (S.I. 1992/3270)
- Medicines Act 1968 (Amendment) (No. 2) Regulations 1992 (S.I. 1992/3271)
- Medicines (Standard Provisions for Licences and Certificates) Amendment (No. 2) Regulations 1992 (S.I. 1992/3272)
- Medicines (Labelling) Amendment Regulations 1992 (S.I. 1992/3273)
- Medicines (Leaflets) Amendment Regulations 1992 (S.I. 1992/3274)
- Education Support Grants Regulations 1992 (S.I. 1992/3275)
- Utilities Supply and Works Contracts Regulations 1992 (S.I. 1992/3279)
- Genetically Modified Organisms (Deliberate Release) Regulations 1992 (S.I. 1992/3280)
- Driving Licences (Designation of Relevant External Law) Order 1992 (S.I. 1992/3281)
- Value Added Tax (Place of Supply of Goods) Order 1992 (S.I. 1992/3283)
- Severn Bridges Tolls (No. 2) Order 1992 (S.I. 1992/3284)
- Road Vehicles (Construction and Use) (Amendment) (No. 8) Regulations 1992 (S.I. 1992/3285)
- Finance Act 1986 (Stamp Duty and Stamp Duty Reserve Tax) (Amendment) Regulations 1992 (S.I. 1992/3286)
- Stamp Duty Reserve Tax (Amendment) Regulations 1992 (S.I. 1992/3287)
- Package Travel, Package Holidays and Package Tours Regulations 1992 (S.I. 1992/3288)
- Origin of Goods (Petroleum Products) (Amendment) Regulations 1992 (S.I. 1992/3289)
- Council Tax (Administration and Enforcement) (Scotland) Amendment Regulations 1992 (S.I. 1992/3290)
- Crofting Counties Agricultural Grants (Scotland) Amendment Scheme 1992 (S.I. 1992/3291)
- Local Government Finance (Garden Squares) (Consequential Amendments) Order 1992 (S.I. 1992/3292)
- Animal Health Act 1981 (Amendments) Regulations 1992 (S.I. 1992/3293)
- Bananas (Interim Measures) Regulations 1992 (S.I. 1992/3294)
- Animals and Animal Products (Import and Export) Regulations 1992 (S.I. 1992/3295)
- Plant Health (Great Britain) (Amendment) Order 1992 (S.I. 1992/3297)
- Products of Animal Origin (Import and Export) Regulations 1992 (S.I. 1992/3298)
- Products of Animal Origin (Third country Imports) (Charges) Regulations 1992 (S.I. 1992/3299)
- Fish Health Regulations 1992 (S.I. 1992/3300)

== 3301–3400 ==
- Shellfish and Specified Fish (Third Country Imports) Order 1992 (S.I. 1992/3301)
- Destructive Imported Animals Act 1932 (Amendment) Regulations 1992 (S.I. 1992/3302)
- Animal By-Products Order 1992 (S.I. 1992/3303)
- Welfare of Animals during Transport Order 1992 (S.I. 1992/3304)
- Export of Goods (Control) Order 1992 (Amendment) Order 1992 (S.I. 1992/3305)
- Orkney Islands Area (Electoral Arrangements) Order 1992 (S.I. 1992/3307) (S. 280)
- Monklands and Bellshill Hospitals National Health Service Trust (Establishment) Order 1992 (S.I. 1992/3308)
- Moray Health Services National Health Service Trust (Establishment) Order 1992 (S.I. 1992/3309)
- West Lothian National Health Service Trust (Establishment) Order 1992 (S.I. 1992/3310)
- North Ayrshire and Arran National Health Service Trust (Establishment) Order 1992 (S.I. 1992/3311)
- Ayrshire and Arran Community Health Care National Health Service Trust (Establishment) Order 1992 (S.I. 1992/3312)
- Caithness and Sutherland National Health Service Trust (Establishment) Order 1992 (S.I. 1992/3313)
- Southern General Hospital National Health Service Trust (Establishment) Order 1992 (S.I. 1992/3314)
- Grampian Healthcare National Health Service Trust (Establishment) Order 1992 (S.I. 1992/3315)
- Royal Alexandra Hospital National Health Service Trust (Establishment) Order 1992 (S.I. 1992/3316)
- Victoria Infirmary National Health Service Trust (Establishment) Order 1992 (S.I. 1992/3317)
- Stirling Royal Infirmary National Health Service Trust (Establishment) Order 1992 (S.I. 1992/3318)
- Raigmore Hospital National Health Service Trust (Establishment) Order 1992 (S.I. 1992/3319)
- Dundee Teaching Hospitals National Health Service Trust (Establishment) Order 1992 (S.I. 1992/3320)
- Yorkhill National Health Service Trust (Establishment) Order 1992 (S.I. 1992/3321)
- Western Isles Islands Area (Electoral Arrangements) Order 1992 (S.I. 1992/3322) (S. 281)
- Combined Probation Areas (Hereford and Worcester) Order 1992 (S.I. 1992/3323)
- Mink Keeping Order 1992 (S.I. 1992/3324)
- London Residuary Body (Number of Members) Order 1992 (S.I. 1992/3325)
- Borough Council of Sandwell (Black Country Spine Road) (Tame Valley Canal Bridge) Scheme 1992 Confirmation Instrument 1992 (S.I. 1992/3326)
- Borough Council of Sandwell (Black Country Spine Road) (Ryders Green Locks Canal Bridge) Scheme 1992 Confirmation Instrument 1992 (S.I. 1992/3327)
- Borough Council of Sandwell (Black Country Spine Road) (Balls Hill Branch/Ridgacre Branch Canal Bridges) Scheme 1992 Confirmation Instrument 1992 (S.I. 1992/3328)
- Customs Duties (ECSC) (Quota and other Reliefs) Order 1992 (S.I. 1992/3329)
- County Court (Amendment No. 3) Rules 1992 (S.I. 1992/3348)
- Access to Neighbouring Land Act 1992 (Commencement) Order 1992 (S.I. 1992/3349)
- College of St. Mark and St. John Scheme (Modification) Order 1992 (S.I. 1992/3351)
- A6 Trunk Road (Clapham Bypass) Order 1992 (S.I. 1992/3354)
- A6 Trunk Road (North of Bedford-South of Milton Ernest) Detrunking Order 1992 (S.I. 1992/3355)

== See also ==
- List of statutory instruments of the United Kingdom
