= List of acts of the Parliament of the United Kingdom from 1948 =

This is a complete list of acts of the Parliament of the United Kingdom for the year 1948.

Note that the first parliament of the United Kingdom was held in 1801; parliaments between 1707 and 1800 were either parliaments of Great Britain or of Ireland. For acts passed up until 1707, see the list of acts of the Parliament of England and the list of acts of the Parliament of Scotland. For acts passed from 1707 to 1800, see the list of acts of the Parliament of Great Britain. See also the list of acts of the Parliament of Ireland.

For acts of the devolved parliaments and assemblies in the United Kingdom, see the list of acts of the Scottish Parliament, the list of acts of the Northern Ireland Assembly, and the list of acts and measures of Senedd Cymru; see also the list of acts of the Parliament of Northern Ireland.

The number shown after each act's title is its chapter number. Acts passed before 1963 are cited using this number, preceded by the year(s) of the reign during which the relevant parliamentary session was held; thus the Union with Ireland Act 1800 is cited as "39 & 40 Geo. 3. c. 67", meaning the 67th act passed during the session that started in the 39th year of the reign of George III and which finished in the 40th year of that reign. Note that the modern convention is to use Arabic numerals in citations (thus "41 Geo. 3" rather than "41 Geo. III"). Acts of the last session of the Parliament of Great Britain and the first session of the Parliament of the United Kingdom are both cited as "41 Geo. 3". Acts passed from 1963 onwards are simply cited by calendar year and chapter number.

== 11 & 12 Geo. 6 ==
Continuing the third session of the 38th Parliament of the United Kingdom, which met from 21 October 1947 until 13 September 1948.

No acts were passed during the fourth session, which met from 14 September 1948 until 25 October 1948; it was a short session created to fulfil the requirement of the Parliament Act 1911 for a bill to be presented and rejected over at least three sessions and at least two years before the Commons could pass it into law without the agreement of the Lords. In this case, the bill in question became the Parliament Act 1949.

This session was also traditionally cited as 11 & 12 G. 6.

=== Public general acts ===
| Short title | Citation | Royal assent |
Long title
| Princess Elizabeth's and Duke of Edinburgh's Annuities Act 1948 (repealed) | 11 & 12 Geo. 6. c. 14 | 11 February 1948 |
An Act to make provision for the payment of certain annuities to Their Royal Highnesses the Princess Elizabeth and the Duke of Edinburgh, and to amend section eight of the Civil List Act, 1937. (Note: Civil List Act 1937 (1 Edw. 8. & 1 Geo. 6. c. 32)) (Repealed by Civil List Act 1952 (15 & 16 Geo. 6 & 1 Eliz. 2. c. 37))
| Overseas Resources Development Act 1948 (repealed) | 11 & 12 Geo. 6. c. 15 | 11 February 1948 |
An Act to provide for the establishment of a Colonial Development Corporation charged with duties for securing development in colonial territories, and for the establishment of an Overseas Food Corporation charged with duties for securing the production or processing of foodstuffs or other products in places outside the United Kingdom, and the marketing thereof, and for matters connected therewith. (Repealed by Overseas Resources Development Act 1959 (7 & 8 Eliz. 2. c. 23))
| Post Office and Telegraph (Money) Act 1948 (repealed) | 11 & 12 Geo. 6. c. 16 | 19 February 1948 |
An Act to provide for raising further money for the development of the postal, telegraphic and telephonic systems and the repayment to the Post Office Fund of money applied thereout for such development. (Repealed by Post Office Act 1961 (9 & 10 Eliz. 2. c. 15))
| Requisitioned Land and War Works Act 1948 | 11 & 12 Geo. 6. c. 17 | 19 February 1948 |
An Act to continue certain provisions of the Requisitioned Land and War Works Act, 1945, (Note: Requisitioned Land and War Works Act 1945 (8 & 9 Geo. 6. c. 43)) to make permanent certain other provisions thereof, and otherwise to amend that Act; to amend the Compensation (Defence) Act, 1939, (Note: Compensation (Defence) Act 1939 (2 & 3 Geo. 6. c. 75)) as respects compensation for the taking of possession of land; to make further provision, by the amendment of those Acts and otherwise, as respects the maintenance and use of certain oil pipelines and the compensation therefor; and for purposes connected with the matters aforesaid.
| Consolidated Fund (No. 1) Act 1948 (repealed) | 11 & 12 Geo. 6. c. 18 | 24 March 1948 |
An Act to apply certain sums out of the Consolidated Fund to the service of the years ending on the thirty-first day of March, one thousand nine hundred and forty-seven, one thousand nine hundred and forty-eight and one thousand nine hundred and forty-nine. (Repealed by Statute Law Revision Act 1964 (c. 79))
| Attempted Rape Act 1948 (repealed) | 11 & 12 Geo. 6. c. 19 | 24 March 1948 |
An Act to authorise the passing of sentences of penal servitude for attempts to commit rape. (Repealed by Sexual Offences Act 1956 (4 & 5 Eliz. 2. c. 69))
| Supreme Court of Judicature (Amendment) Act 1948 (repealed) | 11 & 12 Geo. 6. c. 20 | 24 March 1948 |
An Act to amend the provisions of the Supreme Court of Judicature (Consolidation) Act, 1925, (Note: Supreme Court of Judicature (Consolidation) Act 1925 (15 & 16 Geo. 5. c. 49)) as to the number of divisions in which the Court of Appeal may sit. (Repealed by Statute Law (Repeals) Act 1973 (c. 39))
| Army and Air Force (Women's Service) Act 1948 (repealed) | 11 & 12 Geo. 6. c. 21 | 24 March 1948 |
An Act to enable women to be commissioned and enlisted for service in His Majesty's land and air forces, and for purposes connected therewith. (Repealed by Armed Forces Act 2006 (c. 52))
| Water Act 1948 | 11 & 12 Geo. 6. c. 22 | 24 March 1948 |
An Act to amend the Water Act, 1945, (Note: Water Act 1945 (8 & 9 Geo. 6. c. 42)) and for purposes connected therewith.
| Cinematograph Films Act 1948 (repealed) | 11 & 12 Geo. 6. c. 23 | 24 March 1948 |
An Act to make further provision for securing the exhibition of a certain proportion of British cinematograph films, and otherwise to amend and continue the Cinematograph Films Act, 1938. (Note: Cinematograph Films Act 1938 (1 & 2 Geo. 6. c. 17)) (Repealed by Films Act 1960 (8 & 9 Eliz. 2. c. 57))
| Police Pensions Act 1948 (repealed) | 11 & 12 Geo. 6. c. 24 | 24 March 1948 |
An Act to make provision as to the pensions to be paid to and in respect of members of police forces and as to the length of the period of their service, to amend and repeal with savings certain statutory provisions relating to the pensions to be paid to and in respect of members of police forces and as to the length of their service, and for purposes connected with the matters aforesaid. (Repealed by Police Pensions Act 1976 (c. 35))
| Royal Marines Act 1948 (repealed) | 11 & 12 Geo. 6. c. 25 | 24 March 1948 |
An Act to provide for the establishment of a Volunteer Reserve of Royal Marines, and to amend the law with respect to engagements in the Royal Marines. (Repealed by Reserve Forces Act 1980 (c. 9))
| Local Government Act 1948 | 11 & 12 Geo. 6. c. 26 | 24 March 1948 |
An Act to amend the law relating to Exchequer grants to local authorities and other bodies and grants by local authorities to other local authorities or other bodies, and the law relating to rating, valuation for rating and precepts to rating authorities; to provide for payments for the benefit of local authorities by the British Transport Commission, the British Electricity Authority and the North of Scotland Hydro-Electric Board; to amend the Railway Freight Rebates Enactments, 1929 to 1943, section two hundred and eleven of the Local Government (Scotland) Act, 1947, (Note: Local Government (Scotland) Act 1947 (10 & 11 Geo. 6. c. 43)) the law relating to the payment of expenses and other allowances to members of local authorities and other bodies and the law relating to the manner in which certain securities of local authorities and other bodies may be transferred; to extend the powers of local authorities in certain respects; and for purposes connected with the matters aforesaid.
| Palestine Act 1948 (repealed) | 11 & 12 Geo. 6. c. 27 | 29 April 1948 |
An Act to make provision with respect to the termination of His Majesty's jurisdiction in Palestine, and for purposes connected therewith. (Repealed by Statute Law (Repeals) Act 1981 (c. 19))
| Army and Air Force (Annual) Act 1948 (repealed) | 11 & 12 Geo. 6. c. 28 | 29 April 1948 |
An Act to provide, during twelve months, for the discipline and regulation of the Army and the Air Force. (Repealed by Statute Law Revision Act 1950 (14 Geo. 6. c. 6), Statute Law Revision Act 1953 (2 & 3 Eliz. 2. c. 5) and Revision of the Army and Air Force Acts (Transitional Provisions) Act 1955 (3 & 4 Eliz. 2. c. 20))
| National Assistance Act 1948 | 11 & 12 Geo. 6. c. 29 | 13 May 1948 |
An Act to terminate the existing poor law and to provide in lieu thereof for the assistance of persons in need by the National Assistance Board and by local authorities; to make further provision for the welfare of disabled, sick, aged and other persons and for regulating homes for disabled and aged persons and charities for disabled persons; to amend the law relating to non-contributory old age pensions; to make provision as to the burial or cremation of deceased persons; and for purposes connected with the matters aforesaid.
| Lord High Commissioner (Church of Scotland) Act 1948 (repealed) | 11 & 12 Geo. 6. c. 30 | 13 May 1948 |
An Act to make further provision regarding the allowance payable to His Majesty's High Commissioner to the General Assembly of the Church of Scotland. (Repealed by Lord High Commissioner (Church of Scotland) Act 1974 (c. 19))
| Cotton Spinning (Re-equipment Subsidy) Act 1948 (repealed) | 11 & 12 Geo. 6. c. 31 | 13 May 1948 |
An Act to provide for the payment of grants out of moneys provided by Parliament in respect of the re-equipment or modernisation of cotton spinning concerns and for purposes connected therewith. (Repealed by Statute Law (Repeals) Act 1971 (c. 52))
| River Boards Act 1948 (repealed) | 11 & 12 Geo. 6. c. 32 | 28 May 1948 |
An Act to provide for establishing river boards and for conferring on or transferring to such boards functions relating to land drainage, fisheries and river pollution and certain other functions; and for purposes connected with the matters aforesaid. (Repealed by Water Resources Act 1963 (c. 38))
| Superannuation (Miscellaneous Provisions) Act 1948 | 11 & 12 Geo. 6. c. 33 | 28 May 1948 |
An Act to amend the law relating to pensions and other similar payments to be made to and in respect of persons who have been in certain employment, and for purposes connected with the matters aforesaid.
| Motor Spirit (Regulation) Act 1948 (repealed) | 11 & 12 Geo. 6. c. 34 | 28 May 1948 |
An Act to create certain offences in connection with the supply and use of motor spirit, and for purposes connected therewith. (Repealed by Statute Law Revision Act 1953 (2 & 3 Eliz. 2. c. 5))
| Animals Act 1948 (repealed) | 11 & 12 Geo. 6. c. 35 | 30 June 1948 |
An Act to extend the period during which payments may be made under the Agriculture Act, 1937, (Note: Agriculture Act 1937 (1 Edw. 8 & 1 Geo. 6. c. 70)) in connection with the eradication of bovine tuberculosis, and to amend the Horse Breeding Act, 1918. (Note: Horse Breeding Act 1918 (8 & 9 Geo. 5. c. 13)) (Repealed by Horse Breeding Act 1958 (6 & 7 Eliz. 2. c. 43))
| House of Commons Members' Fund Act 1948 (repealed) | 11 & 12 Geo. 6. c. 36 | 30 June 1948 |
An Act to amend the House of Commons Members' Fund Act, 1939. (Note: House of Commons Members' Fund Act 1939 (2 & 3 Geo. 6. c. 49)) (Repealed by House of Commons Members' Fund Act 2016 (c. 18))
| Radioactive Substances Act 1948 | 11 & 12 Geo. 6. c. 37 | 30 June 1948 |
An Act to make provision with respect to radioactive substances and certain apparatus producing radiation. (Repealed for England and Wales and Scotland by Radioactive Substances Act 1993 (c. 12))
| Companies Act 1948 (repealed) | 11 & 12 Geo. 6. c. 38 | 30 June 1948 |
An Act to consolidate the Companies Act, 1929, (Note: Companies Act 1929 (19 & 20 Geo. 5. c. 23)) the Companies Act, 1947 (Note: Companies Act 1947 (10 & 11 Geo. 6. c. 47)) (other than the provisions thereof relating to the registration of business names, bankruptcy and the prevention of fraud in connection with unit trusts), and certain other enactments amending the first-mentioned Act. (Repealed by Companies Consolidation (Consequential Provisions) Act 1985 (c. 9))
| Industrial Assurance and Friendly Societies Act 1948 (repealed) | 11 & 12 Geo. 6. c. 39 | 30 June 1948 |
An Act to amend the Friendly Societies Acts, 1896 to 1929, and the Industrial Assurance Acts, 1923 to 1929, and to amend provisions corresponding or relating to provisions of those Acts contained in the Industrial and Provident Societies Acts, 1893 to 1928, and other enactments, as to payments on deaths of children, payments on deaths where no grant of probate or administration has been made, investment in savings banks, the designation of auditors appointed thereunder, the mode of determination of disputes and interpretation. (Repealed by Financial Services and Markets Act 2000 (c. 8))
| Education (Miscellaneous Provisions) Act 1948 (repealed) | 11 & 12 Geo. 6. c. 40 | 30 June 1948 |
An Act to amend the Education Acts, 1944 and 1946, the Endowed Schools Acts, 1869 to 1908, the provisions of the Mental Deficiency Act, 1913, (Note: Mental Deficiency Act 1913 (3 & 4 Geo. 5. c. 28)) as to children incapable of receiving education, and the provision of the Children and Young Persons Act, 1933, (Note: Children and Young Persons Act 1933 (23 & 24 Geo. 5. c. 12)) as to the minimum age of employment. (Repealed by Education Act 1996 (c. 56))
| Law Reform (Personal Injuries) Act 1948 | 11 & 12 Geo. 6. c. 41 | 30 June 1948 |
An Act to abolish the defence of common employment, to amend the law relating to the measure of damages for personal injury or death, and for purposes connected therewith.
| National Insurance (Industrial Injuries) Act 1948 (repealed) | 11 & 12 Geo. 6. c. 42 | 30 June 1948 |
An Act to amend the National Insurance (Industrial Injuries) Act, 1946, (Note: National Insurance (Industrial Injuries) Act 1946 (9 & 10 Geo. 6. c. 62)) in relation to increases of disablement benefit under section fourteen of that Act. (Repealed by Statute Law Revision (Consequential Repeals) Act 1965 (c. 55))
| Children Act 1948 (repealed) | 11 & 12 Geo. 6. c. 43 | 30 June 1948 |
An Act to make further provision for the care or welfare, up to the age of eighteen and, in certain cases, for further periods, of boys and girls when they are without parents or have been lost or abandoned by, or are living away from, their parents, or when their parents are unfit or unable to take care of them and in certain other circumstances, to amend the Children and Young Persons Act, 1933, the Children and Young Persons (Scotland) Act, 1937, (Note: Children and Young Persons (Scotland) Act 1937 (1 Edw. 8 & 1 Geo. 6. c. 37)) the Guardianship of Infants Act, 1925 (Note: Guardianship of Infants Act 1925 (15 & 16 Geo. 5. c. 45)) and certain other enactments relating to children; and for purposes connected with the matters aforesaid. (Repealed for England and Wales by Child Care Act 1980 (c. 5) and for Scotland by Social Work (Scotland) Act 1968 (c. 49))
| Merchant Shipping Act 1948 (repealed) | 11 & 12 Geo. 6. c. 44 | 13 July 1948 |
An Act to amend the provisions of the Merchant Shipping Acts relating to matters affected by certain International Conventions adopted at Seattle in the year nineteen hundred and forty-six. (Repealed by Merchant Shipping Act 1970 (c. 36))
| Agriculture (Scotland) Act 1948 | 11 & 12 Geo. 6. c. 45 | 13 July 1948 |
An Act to amend the enactments relating to agricultural holdings in Scotland; to make further provision for the improvement and development of agriculture and the use of agricultural land in Scotland; to authorise the making of grants towards the provision of houses and buildings for landholders and cottars in the Highlands and Islands; to extend the time for making applications for assistance under the Housing (Agricultural Population) (Scotland) Act, 1938; (Note: Housing (Agricultural Population) (Scotland) Act 1938 (1 & 2 Geo. 6. c. 38)) and for purposes connected with the matters aforesaid.
| Employment and Training Act 1948 (repealed) | 11 & 12 Geo. 6. c. 46 | 13 July 1948 |
An Act to make fresh provision with respect to the functions of the Minister of Labour and National Service relating to employment and training for employment; to provide for the establishment of a comprehensive youth employment service; to consolidate with amendments certain enactments relating to the matters aforesaid; and for purposes connected therewith. (Repealed by Employment and Training Act 1973 (c. 50))
| Agricultural Wages Act 1948 | 11 & 12 Geo. 6. c. 47 | 13 July 1948 |
An Act to Consolidate the Agricultural Wages (Regulation) Acts, 1924 to 1947, and so much of the Holidays with Pay Act, 1938, (Note: Holidays with Pay Act 1938 (1 & 2 Geo. 6. c. 70)) as enables a wage regulating authority to make provision for holidays and holiday remuneration for workers employed in agriculture in England and Wales.
| Public Works Loans Act 1948 (repealed) | 11 & 12 Geo. 6. c. 48 | 13 July 1948 |
An Act to grant money for the purpose of certain local loans out of the Local Loans Fund, and for other purposes relating to local loans. (Repealed by Public Works Loans Act 1964 (c. 9))
| Finance Act 1948 | 11 & 12 Geo. 6. c. 49 | 30 July 1948 |
An Act to grant certain duties, to alter other duties, and to amend the law relating to the National Debt and the Public Revenue, and to make further provision in connection with Finance.
| Appropriation Act 1948 (repealed) | 11 & 12 Geo. 6. c. 50 | 30 July 1948 |
An Act to apply a sum out of the Consolidated Fund to the service of the year ending on the thirty-first day of March, one thousand nine hundred and forty-nine, and to appropriate the Supplies granted in this Session of Parliament. (Repealed by Statute Law Revision Act 1964 (c. 79))
| White Fish and Herring Industries Act 1948 (repealed) | 11 & 12 Geo. 6. c. 51 | 30 July 1948 |
An Act to provide for regulating the mesh of fishing nets, for licensing fishing in the North Sea, for giving financial assistance or further financial assistance to inshore fishermen and persons desiring to engage in the inshore fishing industry, to co-operative societies and organisations of fishermen and to the Herring Industry Board, for amending the Herring Industry Acts, 1935 to 1944, and for purposes connected with the matters aforesaid. (Repealed by Sea Fish Industry Act 1970 (c. 11))
| Veterinary Surgeons Act 1948 (repealed) | 11 & 12 Geo. 6. c. 52 | 30 July 1948 |
An Act to make further provision for the teaching of veterinary surgery and for restricting the practice thereof by unqualified persons; to alter the constitution of the Royal College of Veterinary Surgeons and of the Council of that College and otherwise to amend the law relating to veterinary surgeons; to exempt persons practising veterinary surgery from service on juries; and for purposes connected with the matters aforesaid. (Repealed by Statute Law (Repeals) Act 1986 (c. 12))
| Nurseries and Child-Minders Regulation Act 1948 (repealed) | 11 & 12 Geo. 6. c. 53 | 30 July 1948 |
An Act to provide for the regulation of certain nurseries and of persons who for reward receive children into their homes to look after them; and for purposes connected with the matters aforesaid. (Repealed by Children Act 1989 (c. 41))
| Export Guarantees Act 1948 (repealed) | 11 & 12 Geo. 6. c. 54 | 30 July 1948 |
An Act to amend the Export Guarantees Act, 1939, (Note: Export Guarantees Act 1939 (2 & 3 Geo. 6. c. 5)) and the Export Guarantees Act, 1945, (Note: Export Guarantees Act 1945 (8 & 9 Geo. 6. c. 9)) by increasing the limits on the liability which may be undertaken by guarantees given under section one of the first-mentioned Act or section two of the second-mentioned Act. (Repealed by Export Guarantees Act 1949 (12, 13 & 14 Geo. 6. c. 14))
| Factories Act 1948 (repealed) | 11 & 12 Geo. 6. c. 55 | 30 July 1948 |
An Act to amend the Factories Act, 1937, (Note: Factories Act 1937 (1 Edw. 8. & 1 Geo. 6. c. 67)) and provide for matters consequential on the amendment of that Act. (Repealed by Factories Act 1961 (9 & 10 Eliz. 2. c. 34))
| British Nationality Act 1948 | 11 & 12 Geo. 6. c. 56 | 30 July 1948 |
An Act to make provision for British nationality and for citizenship of the United Kingdom and Colonies and for purposes connected with the matters aforesaid.
| Public Registers and Records (Scotland) Act 1948 | 11 & 12 Geo. 6. c. 57 | 30 July 1948 |
An Act to provide for the appointment of a Keeper of the Registers of Scotland and of a Keeper of the Records of Scotland, the transference to such Keepers of the powers and duties of the Keeper of the Registers and Records of Scotland and the discontinuance of that office; to amend the law and procedure regarding registration in the General Register of Sasines and for purposes connected with the aforesaid purposes.
| Criminal Justice Act 1948 | 11 & 12 Geo. 6. c. 58 | 30 July 1948 |
An Act to abolish penal servitude, hard labour, prison divisions and sentence of whipping; to amend the law relating to the probation of offenders, and otherwise to reform existing methods and provide new methods of dealing with offenders and persons liable to imprisonment; to amend the law relating to the proceedings of criminal courts, including the law relating to evidence before such courts; to abolish privilege of peerage in criminal proceedings; to regulate the management of prisons and other institutions and the treatment of offenders and other persons committed to custody; to re-enact certain enactments relating to the matters aforesaid; and for purposes connected therewith. (Repealed for Scotland and Northern Ireland by Statute Law (Repeals) Act 1977 (c. 18))
| Laying of Documents before Parliament (Interpretation) Act 1948 | 11 & 12 Geo. 6. c. 59 | 30 July 1948 |
An Act to declare the meaning of references in Acts of Parliament and subordinate legislation to the laying of instruments or other documents before Parliament or before either House of Parliament, and the effect during a vacancy in the office of the Lord Chancellor or of the Speaker of the House of Commons of the requirement in section four of the Statutory Instruments Act, 1946, (Note: Statutory Instruments Act 1946 (9 & 10 Geo. 6. c. 36)) to send notification forthwith to each of them of an instrument's being made so as to operate before it has been laid before Parliament.
| Development of Inventions Act 1948 (repealed) | 11 & 12 Geo. 6. c. 60 | 30 July 1948 |
An Act to establish a national corporation for securing the development and exploitation of inventions; to authorise advances to the corporation out of the Consolidated Fund and, in respect of certain services, payments to the corporation out of moneys provided by Parliament; and for matters connected therewith. (Repealed by Development of Inventions Act 1967 (c. 32))
| Isle of Man (Customs) Act 1948 (repealed) | 11 & 12 Geo. 6. c. 61 | 30 July 1948 |
An Act to amend the law with respect to customs in the Isle of Man. (Repealed for the Isle of Man by Customs and Excise etc. Order 1976 (GC No 1/76))
| Statute Law Revision Act 1948 | 11 & 12 Geo. 6. c. 62 | 30 July 1948 |
An Act for further promoting the Revision of the Statute Law by repealing Enactments which have ceased to be in force or have become unnecessary and for facilitating the publication of a Revised Edition of the Statutes and the Citation of Statutes.
| Agricultural Holdings Act 1948 (repealed) | 11 & 12 Geo. 6. c. 63 | 30 July 1948 |
An Act to consolidate the Agricultural Holdings Act, 1923, (Note: Agricultural Holdings Act 1923 (13 & 14 Geo. 5. c. 9)) Part III of the Agriculture Act, 1947, (Note: Agriculture Act 1947 (10 & 11 Geo. 6. c. 48)) and certain other enactments relating to agricultural holdings, save, with respect to rights to compensation, in their application to certain cases determined by reference to past events. (Repealed by Agricultural Holdings Act 1986 (c. 5))
| National Service Act 1948 (repealed) | 11 & 12 Geo. 6. c. 64 | 30 July 1948 |
An Act to consolidate the National Service Acts, 1939 to 1947, and the Reinstatement in Civil Employment Act, 1944, (Note: Reinstatement in Civil Employment Act 1944 (7 & 8 Geo. 6. c. 15)) so far as that Act applies to persons called up for national service after the thirty-first day of December, nineteen hundred and forty-eight. (Repealed by Reserve Forces (Safeguard of Employment) Act 1985 (c. 17))
| Representation of the People Act 1948 (repealed) | 11 & 12 Geo. 6. c. 65 | 30 July 1948 |
An Act to amend the law relating to parliamentary and local government elections and to corrupt and illegal practices, and for purposes connected therewith. (Repealed by Statute Law (Repeals) Act 1986 (c. 12) and Parliamentary Constituencies Act 1986 (c. 56))
| Monopolies and Restrictive Practices (Inquiry and Control) Act 1948 or the Monopolies and Restrictive Practices Act 1948 (repealed) | 11 & 12 Geo. 6. c. 66 | 30 July 1948 |
An Act to make provision for inquiry into the existence and effects of, and for dealing with mischiefs resulting from, or arising in connection with, any conditions of monopoly or restriction or other analogous conditions prevailing as respects the supply of, or the application of any process to, goods, buildings or structures, or as respects exports. (Repealed by Fair Trading Act 1973 (c. 41))
| Gas Act 1948 (repealed) | 11 & 12 Geo. 6. c. 67 | 30 July 1948 |
An Act to provide for the establishment of Area Gas Boards and a Gas Council and for the exercise and performance by those Boards and that Council of functions relating to the supply of gas and coke and certain other matters; for the transfer to such Boards as aforesaid and to the said Council of property, rights, obligations and liabilities of gas undertakers and other persons; for co-ordinating the activities of Area Gas Boards and the National Coal Board relating to carbonization; to amend the law relating to the supply of gas; to make certain consequential provision as to income tax; and for purposes connected with the matters aforesaid. (Repealed by Gas Act 1972 (c. 60))

=== Local acts ===
| Short title | Citation | Royal assent |
Long title
| London County Council Improvements Act 1948 | 11 & 12 Geo. 6. c. iv | 11 February 1948 |
An Act to empower the London County Council to execute street and other works and acquire lands in the metropolitan borough of Hammersmith and for other purposes.
| Sutton's Hospital in Charterhouse Charity Scheme Confirmation Act 1948 (repealed) | 11 & 12 Geo. 6. c. v | 24 March 1948 |
An Act to confirm a Scheme of the Charity Commissioners for the application or management of the Charity called Sutton's Hospital in Charterhouse in the county of London. (Repealed by Statute Law (Repeals) Act 2013 (c. 2))
| | Scheme for the application or management of the Charity called Sutton's Hospital in Charterhouse in the County of London regulated by a Scheme of the Charity Commissioners of the 5th March 1929 as varied by Schemes of the said Commissioners of the 29th August 1939 and the 4th September 1942. | |
| Glasgow Corporation Order Confirmation Act 1948 | 11 & 12 Geo. 6. c. vi | 24 March 1948 |
An Act to confirm a Provisional Order under the Private Legislation Procedure (Scotland) Act 1936 (Note: Private Legislation Procedure (Scotland) Act 1936 (26 Geo. 5 & 1 Edw. 8. c. 52)) relating to Glasgow Corporation.
| | Glasgow Corporation Order 1948 Provisional Order to authorise the corporation of the city of Glasgow to construct tunnels under the river Clyde between Linthouse and Whiteinch to construct a tramway and to provide and work trolley vehicles to borrow money to make further provision with respect to the finances of the Corporation and for other purposes. | |
| South Suburban Gas Act 1948 | 11 & 12 Geo. 6. c. vii | 13 May 1948 |
An Act to confer further powers on the South Suburban Gas Company and for other purposes.
| William Brown Nimmo Charitable Trust (Amendment) Order Confirmation Act 1948 | 11 & 12 Geo. 6. c. viii | 30 June 1948 |
An Act to confirm a Provisional Order under the Private Legislation Procedure (Scotland) Act 1936 relating to the William Brown Nimmo Charitable Trust.
| | William Brown Nimmo Charitable Trust (Amendment) Order 1948 Provisional Order to amend the provisions of the William Brown Nimmo Charitable Trust Order 1923 relative to the application and allocation of income of the Trust Fund and for other purposes. | |
| Church of Scotland Trust (Amendment) Order Confirmation Act 1948 (repealed) | 11 & 12 Geo. 6. c. ix | 30 June 1948 |
An Act to confirm a Provisional Order under the Private Legislation Procedure (Scotland) Act 1936 relating to the Church of Scotland. (Repealed by Statute Law (Repeals) Act 1998 (c. 43))
| | Church of Scotland Trust Order 1948 Provisional Order to extend the powers of the Church of Scotland Trust with respect to the investment of the funds belonging to or held by them and for other purposes. | |
| Birmingham University Act 1948 | 11 & 12 Geo. 6. c. x | 30 June 1948 |
An Act to provide for the pooling of investments and moneys of certain endowment funds of the University of Birmingham and for other purposes.
| Shoreham Harbour Act 1948 | 11 & 12 Geo. 6. c. xi | 30 June 1948 |
An Act to alter the constitution of the Shoreham Harbour Trustees so as to provide for the appointment of a trustee by the Chamber of Shipping of the United Kingdom to authorise the Trustees to acquire lands to make further provision with respect to the rates tolls dues and charges demandable by them to make further provision with respect to the raising of money by the Trustees and other financial matters and for other purposes.
| Railway Clearing System Superannuation Fund Act 1948 | 11 & 12 Geo. 6. c. xii | 30 June 1948 |
An Act to provide for the transfer to the trustees of a superannuation scheme established by Coras Iompair Eireann of certain assets comprised in the fund of the Railway Clearing System Superannuation Fund Corporation and for the cesser of membership of that fund of the persons having an interest in the transferred assets and for other purposes.
| Round Oak Steel Works (Level Crossings) Act 1948 | 11 & 12 Geo. 6. c. xiii | 30 June 1948 |
An Act to confirm the construction of certain works to confer powers upon Round Oak Steel Works Limited with respect to two railway level crossings and for other purposes.
| South Lancashire Transport Act 1948 (repealed) | 11 & 12 Geo. 6. c. xiv | 30 June 1948 |
An Act to empower the South Lancashire Transport Company to run trolley vehicles on additional routes to extend the Company's powers of running public service vehicles to provide for the sub-division of the shares in the capital of the Company and for other purposes. (Repealed by South Lancashire Transport Act 1958 (6 & 7 Eliz. 2. c. xxxiii))
| Cardiff Corporation (Extension of Time) Act 1948 | 11 & 12 Geo. 6. c. xv | 30 June 1948 |
An Act to extend the time for the compulsory acquisition by the lord mayor aldermen and citizens of the city of Cardiff of certain lands in the said city and for other purposes.
| University of Sheffield (Lands) Act 1948 | 11 & 12 Geo. 6. c. xvi | 30 June 1948 |
An Act to empower the University of Sheffield to acquire lands in the city of Sheffield and for purposes connected therewith.
| Ascot Race Course Act 1948 | 11 & 12 Geo. 6. c. xvii | 30 June 1948 |
An Act to provide for the closing of part of Winkfield Road in the rural district of Windsor in the county of Berks during the Ascot races and for diverting a footpath and other purposes.
| Warwick Corporation Act 1948 (repealed) | 11 & 12 Geo. 6. c. xviii | 13 July 1948 |
An Act to empower the mayor aldermen and burgesses of the borough of Warwick to acquire lands to provide for the extinguishment of common rights and lammas rights in or over St. Mary's Commonable Lands Lammas Field Common the Pigwells Common and Saltisford Common and for other purposes. (Repealed by Warwick District Council Act 1984 (c. xxiv))
| Cromer Urban District Council Act 1948 | 11 & 12 Geo. 6. c. xix | 13 July 1948 |
An Act to provide for the dissolution of the commissioners elected under the Cromer Protection Acts 1845 (Note: Cromer Protection Act 1845 (8 & 9 Vict. c. xx)) and 1899 (Note: Cromer Protection Act 1899 (62 & 63 Vict. c. ccxl)) and for the transfer of the pier and other property and the powers and obligations of the said commissioners to the urban district council of Cromer to confer further powers on the Council in regard to their pier undertaking lands and other matters to make further and better provision for the improvement health and local government of their district and for other purposes.
| Inverness Burgh Order Confirmation Act 1948 | 11 & 12 Geo. 6. c. xx | 30 July 1948 |
An Act to confirm a Provisional Order under the Private Legislation Procedure (Scotland) Act 1936 relating to Inverness Burgh.
| | Inverness Burgh Order 1948 Provisional Order to extend the boundaries of the burgh of Inverness to confer further powers on the provost magistrates and councillors of the burgh of Inverness as to their water undertaking to authorise the said provost magistrates and councillors to borrow money and for other miscellaneous purposes. | |
| British Transport Commission Order Confirmation Act 1948 | 11 & 12 Geo. 6. c. xxi | 30 July 1948 |
An Act to confirm a Provisional Order under the Private Legislation Procedure (Scotland) Act 1936 relating to the British Transport Commission.
| | British Transport Commission Order 1948 Provisional Order to empower the British Transport Commission to construct works and to acquire additional lands in Scotland to confer further powers on the Commission and for other purposes. | |
| Pier and Harbour Order (Redcar) Confirmation Act 1948 | 11 & 12 Geo. 6. c. xxii | 30 July 1948 |
An Act to confirm a Provisional Order made by the Minister of Transport under the General Pier and Harbour Act 1861 (Note: General Pier and Harbour Act 1861 (24 & 25 Vict. c. 45)) relating to Redcar.
| | Redcar Pier Order 1948 Provisional Order to confirm the acquisition of the undertaking of the Redcar Pier Company Limited by the mayor aldermen and burgesses of the borough of Redcar to confer powers upon them in connection therewith and for other purposes. | |
| Pier and Harbour Order (Swanage) Confirmation Act 1948 | 11 & 12 Geo. 6. c. xxiii | 30 July 1948 |
An Act to confirm a Provisional Order made by the Minister of Transport under the General Pier and Harbour Act 1861 relating to Swanage.
| | Swanage Pier Order 1948 Provisional Order to authorise the Swanage Pier Company to borrow money and to levy and recover increased rates and charges to provide for the revision of the rates and charges and for other purposes. | |
| Portsmouth Corporation (Trolley Vehicles) Order Confirmation Act 1948 | 11 & 12 Geo. 6. c. xxiv | 30 July 1948 |
An Act to confirm a Provisional Order made by the Minister of Transport under the Portsmouth Corporation Act 1930 (Note: Portsmouth Corporation Act 1930 (20 & 21 Geo. 5. c. lii)) relating to Portsmouth Corporation trolley vehicles.
| | Portsmouth Corporation (Trolley Vehicles) Order 1948 Order authorising the lord mayor aldermen and citizens of the city of Portsmouth to use trolley vehicles upon certain routes in the city of Portsmouth. | |
| Darlington Corporation Trolley Vehicles (Additional Routes) Order Confirmation Act 1948 | 11 & 12 Geo. 6. c. xxv | 30 July 1948 |
An Act to confirm a Provisional Order made by the Minister of Transport under the Darlington Corporation (Transport &c.) Act 1925 (Note: Darlington Corporation (Transport, &c.) Act 1925 (15 & 16 Geo. 5. c. cxvi)) relating to Darlington Corporation trolley vehicles.
| | Darlington Corporation Trolley Vehicles (Additional Routes) Order 1948 Order authorising the mayor aldermen and burgesses of the county borough of Darlington to use trolley vehicles upon additional routes in the county borough of Darlington. | |
| Ministry of Health Provisional Order Confirmation (Bristol) Act 1948 (repealed) | 11 & 12 Geo. 6. c. xxvi | 30 July 1948 |
An Act to confirm a Provisional Order of the Minister of Health relating to the city of Bristol. (Repealed by County of Avon Act 1982 (c. iv))
| | Bristol Order 1948 Provisional Order partially altering a Provisional Order. | |
| Ministry of Health Provisional Order Confirmation (Exeter) Act 1948 (repealed) | 11 & 12 Geo. 6. c. xxvii | 30 July 1948 |
An Act to confirm a Provisional Order of the Minister of Health relating to the City and County of the City of Exeter. (Repealed by Exeter City Council Act 1987 (c. xi))
| | Exeter Order 1948 Provisional Order altering and partially repealing a local Act. (Note: Exeter Markets Act 1820 (1 Geo. 4. c. lxxviii)) | |
| Ministry of Health Provisional Order Confirmation (Huddersfield) Act 1948 (repealed) | 11 & 12 Geo. 6. c. xxviii | 30 July 1948 |
An Act to confirm a Provisional Order of the Minister of Health relating to the county borough of Huddersfield. (Repealed by West Yorkshire Act 1980 (c. xiv))
| | Huddersfield Order 1948 Provisional Order for partially repealing certain local Acts and a Provisional Order. | |
| Ministry of Health Provisional Order Confirmation (Macclesfield) Act 1948 (repealed) | 11 & 12 Geo. 6. c. xxix | 30 July 1948 |
An Act to confirm a Provisional Order of the Minister of Health relating to the borough of Macclesfield. (Repealed by Cheshire County Council Act 1980 (c. xiii))
| | Macclesfield Order 1948 Provisional Order altering a local Act. (Note: Macclesfield Borough Waterworks Act 1849 (12 & 13 Vict. c. xxvi)) | |
| Ministry of Health Provisional Order Confirmation (Northampton) Act 1948 (repealed) | 11 & 12 Geo. 6. c. xxx | 30 July 1948 |
An Act to confirm a Provisional Order of the Minister of Health relating to the county borough of Northampton. (Repealed by Northampton Act 1988 (c. xxix))
| | Northampton Order 1948 Provisional Order altering and partially repealing a local Act. (Note: Northampton Corporation Markets and Fairs Act 1870 (33 & 34 Vict. c. xlv)) | |
| Ministry of Health Provisional Order Confirmation (Sheffield) Act 1948 (repealed) | 11 & 12 Geo. 6. c. xxxi | 30 July 1948 |
An Act to confirm a Provisional Order of the Minister of Health relating to the city of Sheffield. (Repealed by Statute Law (Repeals) Act 1989 (c. 43))
| | Sheffield Order 1948 Provisional Order partially altering a local Act. (Note: Sheffield Corporation (Consolidation) Act 1918 (8 & 9 Geo. 5. c. lxi)) | |
| Ministry of Health Provisional Order Confirmation (Stockton-on-Tees) Act 1948 (repealed) | 11 & 12 Geo. 6. c. xxxii | 30 July 1948 |
An Act to confirm a Provisional Order of the Minister of Health relating to the borough of Stockton-on-Tees. (Repealed by Teesside Corporation Act 1971 (c. xvii))
| | Stockton-on-Tees Order 1948 Provisional Order altering a local Act (Note: Stockton-on-Tees Corporation (General Powers) Act 1930 (20 & 21 Geo. 5. c. clxxii)) and a Provisional Order. | |
| Ministry of Health Provisional Order Confirmation (Gloucester) Act 1948 | 11 & 12 Geo. 6. c. xxxiii | 30 July 1948 |
An Act to confirm a Provisional Order of the Minister of Health relating to the city of Gloucester.
| | Gloucester Order 1948 Provisional Order partially repealing and altering local Acts. | |
| Ministry of Health Provisional Order Confirmation (Shrewsbury) Act 1948 | 11 & 12 Geo. 6. c. xxxiv | 30 July 1948 |
An Act to confirm a Provisional Order of the Minister of Health relating to the borough of Shrewsbury.
| | Shrewsbury Order 1948 Provisional Order altering and partially repealing local Acts. | |
| Salford Corporation Act 1948 | 11 & 12 Geo. 6. c. xxxv | 30 July 1948 |
An Act to authorise the mayor aldermen and citizens of the city of Salford to acquire and use lands in the city for certain purposes to make further and better provision for the local government health improvement and finances of the city to confer further powers upon the Corporation with respect to'their several undertakings and in respect of other matters and for other purposes.
| London County Council (Money) Act 1948 (repealed) | 11 & 12 Geo. 6. c. xxxvi | 30 July 1948 |
An Act to regulate the expenditure on capital account and lending of money by the London County Council during the financial period from the first day of April one thousand nine hundred and forty-eight to the thirtieth day of September one thousand nine hundred and forty-nine and for other purposes. (Repealed by London County Council (Loans) Act 1955 (4 & 5 Eliz. 2. c. xxvi))
| Coventry Corporation Act 1948 | 11 & 12 Geo. 6. c. xxxvii | 30 July 1948 |
An Act to empower the mayor aldermen and citizens of the city of Coventry to construct waterworks and to take further water from the river Avon to authorise the supply of heat by means of hot water and steam to alter the qualification for obtaining the freedom of the city to confer further powers on the Corporation with regard to the health improvement and good government of the city and for other purposes.
| Brighton Corporation Act 1948 | 11 & 12 Geo. 6. c. xxxviii | 30 July 1948 |
An Act to confer further powers upon the mayor aldermen and burgesses of the borough of Brighton with respect to the acquisition and use of lands to provide that certain private enclosures in the borough and other lands shall become public pleasure grounds to make further provision with respect to the water undertaking of the said mayor aldermen and burgesses and with respect to the health local government improvement and finance of the borough and for other. purposes.
| Birmingham Corporation Act 1948 | 11 & 12 Geo. 6. c. xxxix | 30 July 1948 |
An Act to authorise the lord mayor aldermen and citizens of the city of Birmingham to supply heat by means of hot water or steam to make further and better provision in reference to the improvement health local government and finances of the city and for other purposes.
| Peabody Donation Fund Act 1948 | 11 & 12 Geo. 6. c. xl | 30 July 1948 |
An Act for the better administration of the charity known as the Peabody Donation Fund and to provide for the incorporation by statute of the governors thereof.
| Ipswich Corporation Act 1948 | 11 & 12 Geo. 6. c. xli | 30 July 1948 |
An Act to confer upon the mayor aldermen and burgesses of the borough of Ipswich further powers in regard to lands to make further provision with regard to their transport and water undertakings and the health local government and improvement of the borough and for other purposes.
| Merthyr Tydfil Corporation Act 1948 | 11 & 12 Geo. 6. c. xlii | 30 July 1948 |
An Act to empower the mayor aldermen and burgesses of the borough of Merthyr Tydfil to execute works for the improvement of the Morlais Brook to confer further powers upon them in regard to lands to make further and better provision in reference to the improvement health local government and finance of the borough to repeal the Dowlais Railway Act 1849 (Note: Dowlais Railway Act 1849 (12 & 13 Vict. c. lxi)) and the Dowlais Railway Act 1854 (Note: Dowlais Railway Act 1854 (17 & 18 Vict. c. cxvi)) and for other purposes.
| Cumberland County Council Act 1948 (repealed) | 11 & 12 Geo. 6. c. xliii | 30 July 1948 |
An Act to confer further powers on the Cumberland County Council and local authorities in relation to the local government improvement and health of the county of Cumberland to provide for the protection and improvement of certain streams in the county to make provision for the finance of the county and for other purposes. (Repealed by Cumbria Act 1982 (c. xv))
| Darwen Corporation Act 1948 | 11 & 12 Geo. 6. c. xliv | 30 July 1948 |
An Act to empower the corporation of Darwen to supply heat by means of hot water or steam to authorise the diversion of a portion of the river Darwen and the acquisition of lands to make further provision in reference to the health improvement local government and finances of the borough of Darwen and for other purposes.
| Egham Urban District Council Act 1948 (repealed) | 11 & 12 Geo. 6. c. xlv | 30 July 1948 |
An Act to empower the urban district council of Egham to make charges for the parking of vehicles on the Runnymede Pleasure Ground to confer further powers on the Council with respect to such ground to make further and better provision for the improvement health and local government of their district and for other purposes. (Repealed by Surrey Act 1985 (c. iii))
| Great Yarmouth Port and Haven Act 1948 | 11 & 12 Geo. 6. c. xlvi | 30 July 1948 |
An Act to confer further powers on the Great Yarmouth Port and Haven Commissioners and for other purposes.
| Rochdale Corporation Act 1948 | 11 & 12 Geo. 6. c. xlvii | 30 July 1948 |
An Act to confer powers upon the Corporation of Rochdale with reference to lands and the acquisition thereof to make further provision with regard to the water passenger transport and markets undertakings of the Corporation to increase the cattle market tolls leviable by the Corporation to authorise the supply of heat by means of hot water or steam to make further provision in reference to the redemption of water annuities the health improvement local government and finances of the borough of Rochdale and for other purposes.
| St. Helens Corporation (Electricity and General Powers) Act 1948 | 11 & 12 Geo. 6. c. xlviii | 30 July 1948 |
An Act to make provision for a site for an electrical generating station partly in the parish of Bold in the rural district of Whiston and partly in the borough of St. Helens in Lancashire to authorise the construction of a sewer and other works to confer further powers upon the mayor aldermen and burgesses of the borough of St. Helens and to make further provision in regard to the health local government and improvement of that borough and for other purposes.
| Smethwick Corporation Act 1948 | 11 & 12 Geo. 6. c. xlix | 30 July 1948 |
An Act to empower the mayor aldermen and burgesses of the county borough of Smethwick to acquire lands in the borough to make further provision with regard to their gas undertaking to authorise the supply of heat by means of hot water or steam and to make further provision for the health local government and improvement of the borough and for other purposes.
| Whitstable Urban District Council Act 1948 | 11 & 12 Geo. 6. c. l | 30 July 1948 |
An Act to make further and better provision for the improvement health and local government of the urban district of Whitstable and for other purposes.
| Beverley Corporation Act 1948 (repealed) | 11 & 12 Geo. 6. c. li | 30 July 1948 |
An Act to confer further powers upon the mayor aldermen and burgesses of the borough of Beverley in regard to lands and to make further provision for the health local government and improvement of the borough and for other purposes. (Repealed by Humberside Act 1982 (c. iii))
| West Riding County Council (General Powers) Act 1948 (repealed) | 11 & 12 Geo. 6. c. lii | 30 July 1948 |
An Act to confer further powers upon the county council of the west riding of Yorkshire in connection with the acquisition of lands to make further provisions in relation to highways and good government in the west riding to confer powers upon the county council and to enact provisions with respect to the finances of the west riding and the superannuation of certain officers and servants and for other purposes. (Repealed by Statute Law (Repeals) Act 1989 (c. 43))
| London County Council (General Powers) Act 1948 | 11 & 12 Geo. 6. c. liii | 30 July 1948 |
An Act to confer further powers upon the London County Council and other authorities and for other purposes.

== 12, 13 & 14 Geo. 6 ==
The fifth session of the 38th Parliament of the United Kingdom, which met from 26 October 1948 until 16 December 1949.

This session was also traditionally cited as 12, 13 & 14 G. 6.

=== Public general acts ===
| Short title | Citation | Royal assent |
Long title
| Colonial Stock Act 1948 (repealed) | 12, 13 & 14 Geo. 6. c. 1 | 16 December 1948 |
An Act to enable stock to which the Colonial Stock Act, 1877, (Note: Colonial Stock Act 1877 (40 & 41 Vict. c. 59)) applies to be made transferable by instrument in writing, and to provide for the extension of the Colonial Stock Acts, 1877 to 1934, to stock of Governments or authorities established for controlling or administering services or matters of common interest to the inhabitants of more than one of the colonies or territories to whose stock any of the said Acts apply or could be made applicable. (Repealed by Statute Law (Repeals) Act 1998 (c. 43))
| Debts Clearing Offices Act 1948 (repealed) | 12, 13 & 14 Geo. 6. c. 2 | 16 December 1948 |
An Act to make provision as to the effect of the expiry of the Debts Clearing Offices and Import Restrictions Act, 1934. (Note: Debts Clearing Offices and Import Restrictions Act 1934 (24 & 25 Geo. 5. c. 31)) (Repealed by Statute Law (Repeals) Act 1986 (c. 12))
| Expiring Laws Continuance Act 1948 (repealed) | 12, 13 & 14 Geo. 6. c. 3 | 16 December 1948 |
An Act to continue certain expiring laws. (Repealed by Statute Law Revision Act 1953 (2 & 3 Eliz. 2. c. 5))
| Judges Pensions (India and Burma) Act 1948 (repealed) | 12, 13 & 14 Geo. 6. c. 4 | 16 December 1948 |
An Act to provide tor the payment out of moneys provided by Parliament of pensions to certain persons who were serving as judges in India before the fifteenth day of August, nineteen hundred and forty-seven, of as judges in Burma before the fourth day of January, nineteen hundred and forty-eight, and for purposes connected with the matters aforesaid. (Repealed by Statute Law (Repeals) Act 2004 (c. 14))
| Civil Defence Act 1948 (repealed) | 12, 13 & 14 Geo. 6. c. 5 | 16 December 1948 |
An Act to make further provision for civil defence. (Repealed by Civil Contingencies Act 2004 (c. 36))
| National Service (Amendment) Act 1948 (repealed) | 12, 13 & 14 Geo. 6. c. 6 | 16 December 1948 |
An Act to substitute eighteen months for twelve months as the term of whole-time service under the National Service Act, 1948, (Note: National Service Act 1948 (11 & 12 Geo. 6. c. 64)) and five and a half years for seven years as the aggregate of the terms of whole-time and part-time service thereunder, and to make certain other amendments in that Act. (Repealed by Statute Law (Repeals) Act 1981 (c. 19))
| Wages Councils Act 1948 (repealed) | 12, 13 & 14 Geo. 6. c. 7 | 16 December 1948 |
An Act to repeal Part I of the Road Haulage Wages Act, 1938, (Note: Road Haulage Wages Act 1938 (1 & 2 Geo. 6. c. 44)) and, so far as it relates to the Central Board established under the said Part I, the Holidays with Pay Act, 1938, (Note: Holidays with Pay Act 1938 (1 & 2 Geo. 6. c. 70)) to convert the said Central Board and any order in force under the said enactments (so far as repealed) into a wages council and a wages regulation order under the Wages Councils Act, 1945, (Note: Wages Councils Act 1945 (8 & 9 Geo. 6. c. 17)) to amend the last-mentioned Act in certain respects, and for purposes connected with the matters aforesaid. (Repealed by Wages Councils Act 1959 (7 & 8 Eliz. 2. c. 69) and Employment Act 1980 (c. 42))
| Recall of Army and Air Force Pensioners Act 1948 (repealed) | 12, 13 & 14 Geo. 6. c. 8 | 16 December 1948 |
An Act to make provision for enabling discharged soldiers or airmen in receipt of service pensions to be recalled for service in an emergency; and for purposes connected therewith. (Repealed by Reserve Forces Act 1980 (c. 9))
| Prize Act 1948 (repealed) | 12, 13 & 14 Geo. 6. c. 9 | 16 December 1948 |
An Act to make provision as to the payment, and the distribution or application, of any prize money granted by His Majesty out of the proceeds of prize captured in the late war, as to payments and receipts in respect of proceeds of prize to or from the Government or a court of a part of His Majesty's dominions outside the United Kingdom, to extinguish for the future the prerogative rights to make grants of prize money to captors and to grant prize bounty, to authorise the payment into the Exchequer of certain unclaimed sums in prize courts, and for purposes connected with the matters aforesaid. (Repealed by Statute Law (Repeals) Act 1977 (c. 18))
| Administration of Justice (Scotland) Act 1948 (repealed) | 12, 13 & 14 Geo. 6. c. 10 | 16 December 1948 |
An Act to authorise the increase of the number of judges of the Court of Session to fifteen, and to amend the law relating to the sessions of that Court, to the appointment of the Lord Ordinary in Exchequer causes and to the office of sheriff substitute. (Repealed by Court of Session Act 1988 (c. 36))

=== Local acts ===
| Short title | Citation | Royal assent |
Long title
| Stornoway Harbour Order Confirmation Act 1948 | 12, 13 & 14 Geo. 6. c. i | 16 December 1948 |
An Act to confirm a Provisional Order under the Private Legislation Procedure (Scotland) Act 1936 (Note: Private Legislation Procedure (Scotland) Act 1936 (26 Geo. 5 & 1 Edw. 8. c. 52)) relating to Stornoway Habour.
| | Stornoway Habour Order 1948 | |
| Dundee Corporation Order Confirmation Act 1948 (repealed) | 12, 13 & 14 Geo. 6. c. ii | 16 December 1948 |
An Act to confirm a Provisional Order under the Private Legislation Procedure (Scotland) Act 1936 relating to Dundee Corporation. (Repealed by Dundee Corporation (Consolidated Powers) Order Confirmation Act 1957 (6 & 7 Eliz. 2. c. iv))
| | Dundee Corporation Order 1948 | |
| Dundee Harbour and Tay Ferries Order Confirmation Act 1948 (repealed) | 12, 13 & 14 Geo. 6. c. iii | 16 December 1948 |
An Act to confirm a Provisional Order under the Private Legislation Procedure (Scotland) Act 1936 relating to Dundee Harbour and Tay Ferries. (Repealed by Dundee Harbour and Tay Ferries Order Confirmation Act 1952 (15 & 16 Geo. 6 & 1 Eliz. 2. c. xx))
| | Dundee Harbour and Tay Ferries Order 1949 | |

== See also ==
- List of acts of the Parliament of the United Kingdom
