= History of fire safety legislation in the United Kingdom =

The history of fire safety legislation in the United Kingdom formally covers the period from the formation of the United Kingdom of Great Britain and Ireland in 1801 but is founded in the history of such legislation in England and Wales, and Scotland before 1708, and that of the Kingdom of Great Britain from 1707 to 1800.

While much British legislation applied to the United Kingdom as a whole, Scotland and Northern Ireland often had their own versions of the legislation, with slight differences. United Kingdom legislation before 1922 remained in force in the Irish Free State after its independence in that year.

== Legislation from predecessor states ==
At the time of the creation of the United Kingdom in 1801, England, Scotland, and Great Britain had some legislation already in place dealing with the issues of fire safety.

=== Kingdom of England ===
As a result of the Great Fire of London, which started on 2 September 1666, it was soon clear that the wooden construction of London's buildings had added greatly to the spread of the fire. As a result, King Charles II issued a proclamation saying that all buildings were to be built out of stone and roads were to be widened.

The English government looked at legislation and introduced laws aimed specifically at fire prevention. The London Cooking Fire Bylaw 1705 specifically prohibited open fires in the attics of thatched buildings.

=== Kingdom of Scotland ===
Following several fires in Edinburgh in 1698 an "Act Regulating the Manner of Building within the Town of Edinburgh" was passed and required that no buildings were to exceed five storeys.

=== Kingdom of Great Britain ===
==== The Fires Prevention (Metropolis) Act 1774 ====
The Fires Prevention (Metropolis) Act, also known as the Building Act 1774, placed buildings into seven classes, with the required thicknesses of the external and party walls stipulated for each of the classes. It also included provisions stating a maximum floor area for stores and warehouses. The Act brought into being the first legislation that dealt with human life and escape, rather than just building safety. The Act stated that parishes were to appoint surveyors and "every parish should provide three or more proper ladders of one, two and three storeys high, for assisting persons in houses on fire to escape therefrom".

== United Kingdom legislation ==
=== Petroleum Acts 1862 to 1881 ===
The Petroleum Acts 1862, 1868 and 1871 to 1881 required a licence from a local authority to store or sell petroleum. Such licences could have conditions attached such as specifying the mode of storage, etc. Petroleum was not to be stored within specified distances of houses or places where goods were stored. Containers for petroleum were to be labeled with appropriate warning notices.

=== Explosives Act 1875 ===
Under the Explosives Act 1875 (38 & 39 Vict. c. 17), many fire brigades took on the responsibility for the safe storage of explosives. The Explosives Act 1875 was partly repealed when the Manufacture and Storage of Explosives Regulations 2005 (SI 2005/1082) was brought into being but the inspection and licensing remained much the same.

=== Petroleum (Consolidation) Act 1928 ===
Under the Petroleum (Consolidation) Act 1928, the storage of petroleum and petroleum products, whether in underground/above ground tanks or storage cabinets, required a licence issued by the licensing authority. In the metropolitan areas, this was the fire authority. In the county authorities, it was the local authority, but usually this was devolved down to the fire service. The Petroleum (Consolidation) Act 1928, as amended by Dangerous Substances and Explosive Atmospheres Regulations 2002 (SI 2002/2776), changed the licensing regime and now requires only that anyone operating a petrol filling station have a licence.

=== Building byelaws and building regulations ===
Under the London Building Acts 1930 to 1939 powers were granted to make building byelaws and the first set issued in 1938 covered many of the constructional matters previously contained in the earlier Acts. Special powers in London (Section 20 Buildings) were also granted in respect of means of escape from certain new and existing buildings based on their height and use. Outside of London individual local authorities could make local building byelaws under the Public Health Act 1936 (26 Geo. 5 & 1 Edw. 8. c. 49).

However, these local building byelaws were not entirely satisfactory in that local authorities were not obliged to make or adopt them, and many did not.

The Public Health Act 1936 was therefore amended by the Public Health Act 1961 (9 & 10 Eliz. 2. c. 64) to permit the making of one set of national building regulations to replace the 1,400 sets of local byelaws. The first national building regulations for England and Wales were made in 1965. However, they required physical fire safety only for the structure of all new, altered or extended buildings.

In 1974 the fire safety scope (of the building regulations in England and Wales) was extended through use of the then new powers given by the Fire Precautions Act 1971, to include minimum safety provisions for means of escape in case of fire.

Thus the first building regulations (for England and Wales) to require general fire precautions for the safe means of escape in case of fire were made in 1974. In practice, these "m-o-e" building regulations drew in large part upon the design guidance and recommendations of the then rather oddly titled "CP3 Chapter 4 "Code of Practice for Means of Escape in Buildings", issued by the BSI (British Standards Institute) in 1971.

Building regulations in England and Wales were not retrospective in their effect. Therefore, when minimum fire safety measures were improved in revised issues of the building regulations documents, existing buildings were not required to adopt these new minimum standards unless they were being altered or extended. Thus "as originally built" buildings were exempt from the new rules from 1974 until the advent of the Regulatory Reform (Fire Safety) Order 2005. This order requires adequate and sufficient general fire precautions suitable for the current users and use, of any given building, to be provided by the responsible person for each building. This did lead to a rather unsatisfactory mishmash of fire safety in the English and Welsh building stock.

The Regulatory Reform (Fire Safety) Order 2005 now requires the responsible person for each building to carry out or commission from a competent person a fire risk assessment to ensure that the general fire precautions within a particular building are fit for the purposes that that building is being currently put to. The current use of an old building by today's occupiers and users has to be taken into account, in arriving at the appropriate general fire precautions. Thus both proportionate and appropriate remedial "fire safety" works may be necessary to discharge the responsible persons legal duty, to control or reduce the risk to life from fire in a building.

=== Factories Act 1937 ===
The Factories Act 1937 (1 Edw. 8. & 1 Geo. 6. c. 67) extended the Factory and Workshop Act 1901 (1 Edw. 7. c. 22) to cover means of escape in case of fire. The act required that the factory owner have a plan of escape in case of fire and brought in the first rudimentary fire certificates.

=== Fire Services Act 1947 ===
Before 1947, issues of fire safety were in the hands of the local authority, and the legal enforcement of issues under the Factories Act and Office Shops and Railway Premises Act were dealt with by the local authority, having usually devolved this down to the fire brigade. The introduction of the Fire Services Act 1947 gave the fire brigade its first responsibilities for fire safety. Section 1 of the Fire Services Act defined the duties of a fire brigade and further went to say under section 1, sub-section 1 paragraph F, commonly referred to as 11(F), that a fire brigade must give advice and assistance on matters of fire prevention if so requested by any person. The Act did not however give any other powers to the fire brigade in terms of inspection and enforcement.

=== Factories Act 1961 ===
A fire at the Eastwood Mills, Keighley, Yorkshire in February 1956, in which eight people died, resulted in the act being further amended in 1959 giving the fire brigades the power to inspect factories for fire safety. Finally a re-written Factories Act 1961 (9 & 10 Eliz. 2. c. 34) was introduced to consolidate all the changes. The fire certificates were also updated to include not only means of escape but also provision for fighting fire and structural fire separation.

=== Licensing Act 1961 ===
On 1 May 1961, a fire occurred at the Top Storey Club in Bolton, which resulted in the deaths of nineteen people. Fourteen died in the building, and five were killed attempting to jump out of windows into the canal that ran alongside the building. The Licensing Act 1961 was almost immediately amended to update the requirements for safety in case of fire.

=== Offices, Shops and Railway Premises Act 1963 ===
In June 1960, a fire broke out in the William Henderson & Sons, Liverpool department store. Ten people were trapped in the fourth floor and one man fell to his death whilst assisting others to safety from a window ledge.

This fire prompted the government to amend the Office Shops and Railway Premises Act (OSRA) in line with the Factories Act 1961 (9 & 10 Eliz. 2. c. 34) and the Offices, Shops and Railway Premises Act 1963 (c. 41) was introduced

=== Fire Precautions Act 1971 ===
Fire Precautions Act 1971 (Note: Section 44(1).)
- Act of Parliament
- Parliament of the United Kingdom
- Long title: An Act to make further provision for the protection of persons from fire risks; and for purposes connected therewith.
- Citation: 1971 c. 40
- Territorial extent: England and Wales; Scotland; Northern Ireland (section 42); (Note: Section 44(2).)

Dates
- Royal assent: 27 May 1971
- Commencement: various (Note: Section 44(3).)
- Repealed: 1 October 2006
Other legislation
Amends	Fire Services Act 1947; Cinematograph Act 1952; Offices, Shops and Railway Premises Act 1963; Rent Act 1965; Rent Act 1968; Rent (Scotland) Act 1971
Amended by	Rent Act 1977; Statute Law (Repeals) Act 1978; Forgery and Counterfeiting Act 1981; Building Act 1984; Rent (Scotland) Act 1984; Cinemas Act 1985; Statute Law (Repeals) Act 1986; Fire Safety and Safety of Places of Sport Act 1987; Statute Law (Repeals) Act 2004; Manufacture and Storage of Explosives Regulations 2005
Repealed by	England and Wales: Regulatory Reform (Fire Safety) Order 2005; Scotland: Fire (Scotland) Act 2005 (Consequential Modifications and Savings) Order 2006

Status: Repealed

Text of statute as originally enacted

Revised text of statute as amended

On Boxing Day 1969, a fire at the Rose and Crown Hotel, Saffron Walden killed eleven people whilst seventeen were rescued. The fire prompted the government to look at the whole structure of fire safety legislation and the Fire Precautions Act 1971 (c. 40) was passed into law.

This act combined the fire sections of the Factories Act 1961 (c. 34) and the Offices, Shops and Railway Premises Act 1963 (c. 41) and brought in new premises like hotels. This was an open designating act, and it contained a wide list of premises types from which the Secretary of State could select specific premises types to be covered by statutory instrument.

The responsibility for enforcing the act fell on the fire service, except in civil Crown premises, where Her Majesty's Inspectors of Fire Service (HMIFS) carried out the enforcement.

The Fire Precautions Act 1971 came into force in 1972, when hotels and boarding houses were the first class of premises to be designated. Under the Fire Precautions (Hotels and Boarding Houses) Order 1972 (SI 1972 /238) (and an equivalent order for Scotland), any premises where there was sleeping accommodation for more than six persons (staff or guests), or any sleeping accommodation above the first floor or below the ground floor, required a fire certificate issued by the fire authority.

The Fire Precautions (Factories, Offices, Shops and Railway Premises) Order 1976 (SI 1976/2009), further designated premises to require fire certificates for factories, offices, shops and railway premises:

- Where more than 20 persons are employed
- Where more than 10 persons are employed elsewhere than the ground floor
- In factories, where explosives or highly flammables are stored or used in or under the premises.

The 1976 order was revoked and replaced by the Fire Precautions (Factories, Offices, Shops and Railway Premises) Order 1989 (SI 1989/76).

The Fire Precautions Act 1971 was amended by the Fire Safety and Safety of Places of Sport Act 1987 (c. 27), by laying down stipulations that the occupier of the premises must take into consideration. These were known as interim arrangements, and the occupier, having made an application for a fire certificate, now had a duty to ensure that

- the means of escape can be safely and effectively used at all material times
- the means of fire fighting are maintained in efficient working order, and
- all people employed to work in the premise should receive instructions and have training in what action to take in the event of a fire.

Premises that fell outside of these rules did not have to have a fire certificate but had to provide limited fire safety by virtue of section 9A of the act.

The 1971 act gave power to the fire authority to apply to the court to prohibit the use of premises if they were dangerous and there was a serious risk of imminent danger from fire for persons in the premises (prohibition notice). This prohibition power applied widely to all manner of premises but excluded single private dwellings. One of the changes introduced in 1987 was for the fire authority to issue prohibition notices directly, without the need to apply to the court.

One major issue with the act was that fire certification was only ever applied to the designated premises. Places of public entertainment such as cinemas, theatres and nightclubs were never designated so the powers of inspection and enforcement remained with the local authority licensing department.

In many areas, the fire brigade carried out the inspections on behalf of the licensing department, but had no powers other than those granted by section 10 (Prohibition Notice).

The Fire Precautions Act 1971 and its "fire certificates" were totally repealed and replaced in England and Wales by the Regulatory Reform (Fire Safety) Order 2005 (SI 2005/1541), which came into full force on 1 October 2006. The act is still in force on the Isle of Man, with hotels, licensed premises and places of entertainment requiring a fire certificate.

=== The Fire Precautions (Factories, Offices, Shops and Railway Premises) Order 1976 ===
Fire Precautions (Factories, Offices, Shops and Railway Premises) Order 1976
- Statutory Instrument
- Parliament of the United Kingdom
- Citation: SI 1976/2009

Dates
- Made: 26 November 1976
- Laid before Parliament: 6 December 1976
- Commencement: 1 January 1977
Other legislation
Made under	Fire Precautions Act 1971

Text of statute as originally enacted

The Fire Precautions (Factories, Offices, Shops and Railway Premises) Order 1976 (SI 1976/2009) gave some updates to the Fire Precautions Act 1971 (c. 40) and cleared several points about self-employed workers, the numbers of hours worked (part-time workers) and how aggregation of these could be used to bring some "grey" premises into the scope of requiring a fire certificate. It also brought in exemptions from the requirement to have a fire certificate in certain small premises.

(These regulations were revoked in 1989; see below.)

=== Fire Certificates (Special Premises) Regulations 1976 ===
Fire Certificates (Special Premises) Regulations 1976
- Statutory Instrument
- Parliament of the United Kingdom
- Citation: SI 1976/2003

Dates
- Made: 26 November 1976
- Laid before Parliament: 7 December 1976
- Commencement: 1 January 1977
Other legislation
Made under	Fire Precautions Act 1971
Revoked by	Regulatory Reform (Fire Safety) Order 2005

Status: Revoked

Text of statute as originally enacted

Following several small fires in chemical plants and a major explosion and fire at the Nypro plant in Flixborough on 1 June 1974, the government decided to require fire certificates for major chemical and other risks and to give enforcement to the Health and Safety Executive (HSE). It issued the Fire Certificates (Special Premises) Regulations 1976 (SI 1976/2003), enforced by the HSE on a similar line to the Fire Precautions Act 1971.

These regulations were brought in to require premises having over a threshold quantity or using certain named hazardous substances to possess a fire certificate. The regulations applied to whole sites rather than the single premise or building approach used in the Fire Precautions Act 1971.

These regulations also applied to temporary buildings associated with construction work. Fire certificates were required for some of these buildings, and there were some fire safety obligations generally imposed in respect of those temporary buildings, which did not require a fire certificate.

These regulations were revoked by the Regulatory Reform (Fire Safety) Order 2005 (SI 2005/1541) for England and Wales.

=== Building Act 1984 ===
In England and Wales, the powers to make building regulations were consolidated and re-enacted in the Building Act 1984 (c. 55). All building regulations made by the Secretary of State since then have included minimum fire safety measures (for both physical fire resistance and safe means of escape) for all new, extended or altered buildings. The current building regulation's fire safety documents were last revised and issued in 2006.

See Approved Document - Part B - Fire Safety Vol 1 & 2 (available to download free from the UK Government's "Planning Portal" website).

A major simplification and enlargement of the scope of the English and Welsh fire safety laws was implemented by the Regulatory Reform (Fire Safety) Order 2005, in force 1 October 2006). The new Regulatory Reform (Fire Safety) Order 2005 again amended and extended the scope of fire safety provision within the Building Regulations 2000 (SI 2000/2531).

Building Regulation (Reg.16B) now require a developer or architect to hand over sufficient fire safety information to the building's future responsible person, so he may commission an appropriate fire risk assessment for the new building and its occupiers and/or users.

Note: building regulations and fire safety laws are different, but similar, in Scotland and Northern Ireland.

=== Fire Safety and Safety of Places of Sport Act 1987 ===
Fire Safety and Safety of Places of Sport Act 1987 (Note: Section 50(1).)
- Act of Parliament
- Parliament of the United Kingdom
- Long title: An Act to amend the Fire Precautions Act 1971 and other enactments relating to fire precautions; to amend the Safety of Sports Grounds Act 1975 and make like provision as respects stands at sports grounds; to extend as respects indoor sports premises, and amend, the statutory provisions regulating entertainment licences; and for connected purposes.
- Citation: 1987 c. 27
- Territorial extent: England and Wales; Scotland; (Note: Section 50(3)–(7).)

Dates
- Royal assent: 15 May 1987
- Commencement: various (Note: Section 50(2).)
Other legislation
Amends	Fire Precautions Act 1971; Safety of Sports Grounds Act 1975
Amended by	Local Government (Wales) Act 1994; Local Government etc. (Scotland) Act 1994; Licensing Act 2003; Courts Act 2003; Building (Scotland) Act 2003; Statute Law (Repeals) Act 2004; Fire and Rescue Services Act 2004; Regulatory Reform (Fire Safety) Order 2005; Fire (Scotland) Act 2005 (Consequential Modifications and Savings) Order 2006

Status: Amended

Text of statute as originally enacted

Text of the Fire Safety and Safety of Places of Sport Act 1987 as in force today (including any amendments) within the United Kingdom, from legislation.gov.uk.

Following a fire on 11 May 1985 at the Bradford City football ground in which 56 people died a committee was set up to examine the Safety of Sports Grounds Act 1975. They recommended that the act be rewritten as the Fire Safety and Safety of Places of Sport Act 1987 (c. 27). The act did not replace the Fire Precautions Act 1971 (c. 40) but gave more powers to the local building control authority and fire authority. These powers included the power to charge for the issue of a fire certificate.

(Modified and partially replaced by the Regulatory Reform (Fire Safety) Order 2005; see below.)

=== Fire Precautions (Sub-surface Railway Stations) Regulations 1989 ===
Fire Precautions (Sub-surface Railway Stations) Regulations 1989
- Statutory Instrument
- Parliament of the United Kingdom
- Citation: SI 1989/1401

Dates
- Made: 4 August 1989
- Laid before Parliament: 14 August 1989
Other legislation
Made under	Fire Precautions Act 1971

Text of statute as originally enacted

These precautions followed a serious fire at the King's Cross Underground Station on 18 November 1987, which resulted in the loss of 31 lives, including Station Officer Colin Townsley of the London Fire Brigade.

The Fire Precautions (Sub-surface Railway Stations) Regulations 1989 (SI 1989/1401) were made under section 12 of the Fire Precautions Act 1971 (c. 40) and were brought into effect on 18 September 1989.

(Repealed and replaced, for England, in 2010 by regulations made under Regulatory Reform (Fire Safety) Order 2005.)

=== Fire Precautions (Workplace) Regulations 1997 ===
Fire Precautions (Workplace) Regulations 1997
- Statutory Instrument
- Parliament of the United Kingdom
- Citation: SI 1997/1840

Dates
- Made: 28 July 1997
- Laid before Parliament: 29 July 1997
- Commencement: 1 December 1997
Other legislation
Made under	Fire Precautions Act 1971
Revoked by	Regulatory Reform (Fire Safety) Order 2005

Status: Revoked

Text of statute as originally enacted

In the early 1990s, the government was required to implement several European directives including one on fire safety. This was at the height of deregulation and the government, architects, commerce and industry considered that fire brigades were too inflexible and demanded belt and braces solutions. They and the directive called for a new approach to fire safety and demanded a cheaper and more flexible system. They decided the prescriptive method used by the fire service should be replaced by a more flexible fire risk assessment approach and consequently the Fire Precautions (Workplace) Regulations 1997 (SI 1997/1840) was placed on the statute books using section 12 of the Fire Precautions Act 1971. They also wanted the responsibility of implementing the legislation to be removed from the fire service and placed on the employers, but the fire service would be the enforcing authority for the legislation. It was implemented using the Management of Health and Safety at Work Regulations 1992 (SI 1992/2051) (MHSAW) (replaced in 1999).

These regulations differed from the previous fire safety legislation in that they introduced the concept of risk assessment in a style similar to the Health and Safety at Work etc. Act 1974.

The workplace regulations also brought in a new form of enforcement of the legislation. Under the Fire Precautions Act, Section 10 gave the fire brigade the power to close a premises if there was serious danger from fire; however, there was very little they could do to bring a premises up to standard. Section 4 of the Fire Precautions Act did give some limited powers to issue a 'Notice of Steps' to be taken to correct any defects.

The workplace regulations brought in a new enforcement method, the 'improvement notice'. This allowed the enforcing authority to serve notice of any defects and give a reasonable time scale as to when the work should be completed; failure to complete the work in that time could result in prosecution.

(Revoked by the Regulatory Reform (Fire Safety) Order 2005 for England and Wales.)

=== The Fire Precautions (Workplace) (Amendment) Regulations 1999 ===
Fire Precautions (Workplace) (Amendment) Regulations 1999
- Statutory Instrument
- Parliament of the United Kingdom
- Citation: SI 1999/1877

Dates
- Made: 29 June 1999
- Laid before Parliament: 7 July 1999
- Commencement: 1 December 1999
Other legislation
Made under	Fire Precautions Act 1971
Revoked by	Regulatory Reform (Fire Safety) Order 2005

Status: Revoked

Text of statute as originally enacted

The Fire Precautions (Workplace) (Amendment) Regulations 1999 (SI 1999/1877) were a result of European Communities Act 1972. They brought the UK legislation up to a standard that met the fire safety requirements of two health and safety European Directives, 89/391/EEC and 89/654/EEC, adopted in 1989. The amendments were laid before Parliament on 7 July 1999 and became law on 1 December 1999.

Unfortunately, they did not revoke sections 5 to 9 of the Fire Precautions Act 1971, which required fire certificates; consequently, the legislation now ran in parallel with the Workplace Regulations but secondary to it. Employers or persons having overall control of the workplace were made responsible under the regulations to implement and conduct fire safety risk assessments, also produce a record if they employ more than five people. The fire brigades enforced the regulations and conducted limited inspections to ensure employers are carrying out their responsibilities.

(Repealed and totally replaced by the Regulatory Reform (Fire Safety) Order 2005; see below.)

=== Licensing Act 2003 ===
(Modified by the Regulatory Reform (Fire Safety) Order 2005; see below.)

'Licensed premises' covered a number of types of establishment, including places where alcohol was sold or consumed, theatres, cinemas and places of entertainment.

Many of these premises fell outside the scope of the Fire Precautions Act 1971 but had their own legislation, such as the Theatres Act and the Cinemas Act, which contained within them, their own fire regulations. Most of these acts have now been amended or repealed and their fire precautions now fall under the Regulatory Reform (Fire Safety) Order 2005 or the Licensing Act 2003 (c. 17).

The Licensing Act 2003 introduced a requirement for licences to sell or supply alcohol, provide regulated entertainment or provide late night refreshment with the licence holder serving notice of application directly upon the fire and rescue authority. This amended or repealed much of the old licensing legislation, including Theatres Act 1968, Cinemas Act 1985, Gaming Acts 1968 & 1990 and Licensing Act 1964.

Laws such as the Local Government Miscellaneous Provisions Act 1976 were major legislation but contain sections covering fire safety of some outdoors events, private film shows, neon signs and some licensed premises that fell outside the scope of the 2003 act. There were also numerous local acts such as the Greater Manchester Act 1981, which give the fire brigade powers to control flammable stacks, night cafes and licence underground car parks.

The old acts (repealed by Regulatory Reform (Fire Safety) Order 2005 on 1 October 2006) that controlled licensing caused much confusion as there were conflicts in who enforced the various parts of the legislation and where it was to be enforced.

Licensed premises (pubs, clubs, cinemas, theatres) were classed as providing a service, not as shops, and so did not normally fall within the designated groups in the FPA, so some never needed fire certificates. However, the local authority who issued the licence usually asked the fire brigade to inspect plans and carry out inspections, which led to confusion even by fire safety officers.

Coupled with all this, materials such as celluloid have been recognised as highly flammable since early days of its usage, and acts such as the Celluloid and Cinematograph Films Act 1922 and the Cinematograph Act 1952 gave the fire brigade powers to take samples of film and test them for flammability even though they were not the enforcing authority.

Other licensing legislation such as the licensing of underground car parks by means of a local act such as the Greater Manchester Act 1981 applied where local acts existed so one authority licensed and the next one did not. There were also arguments about definitions of shops etc., further confusing the issues.

=== Fire and Rescue Services Act 2004 ===
The Fire and Rescue Services Act 2004 (c. 21) applies only in England and Wales. Section 6 lays out what a fire service must do in relation to fire safety. It states that a fire and rescue authority must make provision for the purpose of promoting fire safety in its area not only by the enforcement of specific fire safety legislation but also by a proactive strategy targeted at all sections of the community by:

- provision of information, publicity and encouragement in respect of the steps to be taken to prevent fires and death or injury by fire
- giving of advice on request on how to prevent fires and restrict their spread in buildings and other property and the means of escape from buildings and other property in case of fire.

This meant that the service has had to change its a fire safety strategies and now include public education as well as legal enforcement. All fire and rescue services today have specialist departments dealing with community fire safety education. The job of these departments is to educate by talking to school children and vulnerable areas of the community and to assist the public, with many FRS running campaigns, offering free smoke detectors as part of the drive to reduce deaths in the home.

=== Housing Act 2004 ===
The Housing Act 2004 (c. 34) reformed (and expanded) the former narrow "unfitness standard", and gave (in England and Wales) all environmental health officers (EHOs) strong enforcement powers, to inspect any dwelling (rented, leased, owner-occupied, or what ever) for the 23 defined "hazards". This is known as the "Housing Health and Safety Rating System" (HHSRS) toolbox.

An EHO may order the removal of any of these hazards where it is a "Cat 1" risk to the dwellings occupiers. EHOs can enforce non-action and carry out remedial works, and recharge the dwelling with the costs. Owners of dwellings can also be prosecuted for any of the 23 defined hazards.

"Fire safety" is one of the defined hazards. EHOs may use their powers on single-family dwellings independently from the fire authority's powers under the Regulatory Reform (Fire Safety) Order 2005, to require adequate and sufficient fire safety measures in existing dwellings.

This carries on the long British legal tradition, which started with the Housing Act 1875, that owners and/or occupiers may not put anyone in danger by their actions or inactions, and must act to protect their neighbours. If they fail to so, the local council's EHOs have a duty to consider taking appropriate legal action to protect the community at large. (Womack and Bone LLP)

=== Regulatory Reform (Fire Safety) Order 2005 ===
In 2000, the government in the form of the Office of the Deputy Prime Minister (OPDM) set up a review of the fire safety legislation led by the Deputy Prime Minister John Prescott MP and found that there were some 80 acts of Parliament or parts of acts which specified fire safety legislation. In order to revamp the whole thing and bringing it up to date, they decided to place all the odd bits of fire legislation under the umbrella of the Regulatory Reform (Fire Safety) Order 2005 (SI 2005/1541), which became law in October 2006. It applies to England and Wales only.

The major change in the legislation was that it brought in the concept of risk assessment rather than prescriptive codes.

The Fire Precautions Act 1971 had relied on codes and guides for its implementation, and the Fire Precautions (Workplace) Regulations had changed that a little by introducing risk assessment as a way of complying, but because the requirement for a fire certificate was never repealed, the guides and codes were still used as a prescriptive means of applying the law. The Regulatory Reform (Fire Safety) Order 2005 took this one step further and implemented fully a risk assessment based regime.

The Regulatory Reform (Fire Safety) Order 2005 lays out the foundation of the fire risk assessment by saying that the responsible person (employer, person in control of the building, or the owner) must take into account for the safety of their employees and anyone else who may lawfully be on or near their premises.

The following must be provided (to protect their employees and anyone else who may lawfully be on or near the premises):

- means of detection and giving warning in case of fire
- the provision of means of escape
- the provision of emergency lighting to escape routes
- means of fighting fire (where necessary)
- the training of staff in fire safety
- the publication of an "emergency plan" and the "fire safety procedures" for a specific building

The Regulatory Reform (Fire Safety) Order 2005 then tells the responsible person (employer, person in control of the building, or owner) how they must assess these items in order to protect their employees and anyone else who may lawfully be on or near their premises.

- carry out a fire risk assessment of the workplace and communal areas in blocks of flats or maisonettes
- identify the significant findings of the risk assessment and the details of anyone who might be at risk in case of fire; under the Management of Health and Safety Regulations, these must be recorded if more than five persons are employed
- provide and maintain such fire precautions as are necessary to safeguard those who use the workplace
- provide information, instruction and training to employees about the fire precautions in the workplace

The Regulatory Reform (Fire Safety) Order 2005 2005 now requires the responsible person for each building to carry out or commission from a competent person a Fire Risk Assessment to ensure that the general fire precautions within a particular building are fit for the purposes that that building is being currently put to. The current use of an old building by today's occupiers and users has to be taken into account, in arriving at the appropriate general fire precautions. Thus, both proportionate and appropriate remedial "fire safety" works may be necessary to discharge the responsible person's legal duty, to control or reduce the risk to life from fire in a building. (Womack & Bone LLP)

==== The wider scope of UK fire safety law 1 October 2006 ====
The Regulatory Reform (Fire Safety) Order 2005 applies to most buildings and sites, except for private dwellings, though it does apply to communal areas/escape routes serving dwellings. The fire authority is the principal enforcing authority. However, there are other enforcing authorities – the Health and Safety Executive for most construction sites and on ships under construction, the Defence Fire and Rescue Service for defence premises, the Office for Nuclear Regulation (ONR) for nuclear sites, and the local authority for sports grounds.

=== Fire Safety Act 2021 ===
The Fire Safety Act 2021 (c. 24) provides an explicit explanation of the parameters that fall under the Regulatory Reform (Fire Safety) Order 2005, such as structures, external walls (cladding and balconies alike), including individual flat entrance doors between domestic properties and common areas in multi-occupied residential buildings.

=== The Fire Safety (England) Regulations 2022 ===
Fire Safety (England) Regulations 2022
- Statutory Instrument
- Parliament of the United Kingdom
- Citation: SI 2022/547

Dates
- Made: 17 May 2022
- Laid before Parliament: 18 May 2022
- Commencement: 23 January 2023
Other legislation
Made under	Regulatory Reform (Fire Safety) Order 2005

Text of statute as originally enacted

The Fire Safety (England) Regulations 2022 (SI 2022/547) introduce new duties under the Regulatory Reform (Fire Safety) Order 2005 for building owners or managers (responsible persons). The regulations mandate that Responsible Parties in multi-level residential dwellings take appropriate actions depending on the building's height.

==== Enforcement ====
The ongoing audit and 'enforcement' of both the required "fire risk assessments" and the necessary 'General Fire Precautions' in any premise subject to the Regulatory Reform (Fire Safety) Order 2005, are the legal duty on the local fire authority.

Fire authorities should follow up on their audit and inspection of any premises and they may order additional fire precautions or even issue a prohibition notice, to prevent the use of a very dangerous building.

Fire authorities can also issue informal "action plans" or issue informal "notice of fire safety deficiencies" letters.

Failure of the responsible person to implement a fire risk assessment's recommendations, or to follow (within the time limit specified by the fire authority) up on a fire authority's informal "Action Plan" or "NFSD" letter, will usually lead to a formal enforcement order being issued.

If the enforcement notice or prohibition notice is ignored, then court action for these criminal offenses will be taken by the local fire authority. The Crown Court may imprison the responsible person for up to two years for each breach of any of the Regulatory Reform (Fire Safety) Order 2005's articles, and/or impose fines of up to £10,000 for each breach of any of the Regulatory Reform (Fire Safety) Order 2005's articles, on individuals.

The Crown Court may impose unlimited fines on any company, breaching the requirements and legal duties imposed by the Regulatory Reform (Fire Safety) Order 2005. Fines of £300,000 to £400,000 have already been imposed on two major companies for their corporate fire safety failings under the Regulatory Reform (Fire Safety) Order 2005. In addition, to these fines, the legal costs of bringing the successful prosecution may also be recovered from the convicted 'fire criminal'.

HHSRS - One should not forget the parallel powers of each local council's environmental health officer (EHO) to enforce fire safety within both single dwellings and in blocks of flats and buildings providing 'Housing in Multiple Occupation' (HMO), under their Housing Act 2004 (HHSRS/"unfitness") powers. "Owners of HMOs may need a renewable licence to operate, from the local authority EHO."

Enforcement Concordat - A fire authority may and sometimes does pass a fire safety complaint over to the local housing authority.

"Beds in sheds" - English fire authorities have recently started to prosecute owners and operators of illegally built or converted "dwellings" in non-habitable buildings, such as 'domestic garages in gardens' and disused offices, public houses, factories, under the Regulatory Reform (Fire Safety) Order 2005.

==== "Name and shame" ====
Fire authorities in England and Wales are legally required to publish the (responsible person's) name and the premises address, for which they have issued an enforcement notice, an alterations notice, or a prohibition notice, under the powers given to them by the Regulatory Reform (Fire Safety) Order 2005. Many fire authorities have put these lists on their websites. Most fire authorities' "name and shame" lists also indicate which "notices" are "still outstanding" or "now complied with". For example, see the London Fire Brigade website. (Womack & Bone LLP)

==== Penalties ====
Enforcement action has been taken by many fire authorities. Several owners, and landlords have been taken to court, and heavily fined. A growing number of landlords have been jailed, for persistent breaches of the Regulatory Reform (Fire Safety) Order 2005.

The Crown Court may imprison the responsible person for up to two years for each breach of any of the Regulatory Reform (Fire Safety) Order 2005's articles, and/or impose fines of up to £10,000 for each breach of any of the Regulatory Reform (Fire Safety) Order 2005's articles, on individuals. The Crown Court may impose Unlimited fines on any company, breaching the requirements and legal duties imposed by the Regulatory Reform (Fire Safety) Order 2005. Fines of £300,000 to £400,000 have already been imposed on two major companies for their corporate fire safety failings under the Regulatory Reform (Fire Safety) Order 2005. In addition to these fines, the legal costs of bringing the successful prosecution may also be recovered from the convicted 'fire criminal'.

Every "real" fire is now followed up by the local fire authority's fire safety inspectors.

==== Case law ====
The English Court of Appeal, on 16 June 2010, upheld a Crown Court fine of £400,000 (with additional legal costs of £150,000) against New Look Retailers Ltd. Following a major fire in the New Look Oxford Street shop, whilst no one was hurt, the building was lost and Oxford Street was closed for two days.

==== Scotland and Northern Ireland ====
The equivalent legislation in Scotland to the Regulatory Reform (Fire Safety) Order 2005 is the Fire (Scotland) Act 2005 (asp 5). Its scope (in Scotland) covers what the Regulatory Reform (Fire Safety) Order 2005 and the Fire and Rescue Services Act 2004 cover in England and Wales. Part 3 of the act deals specifically with fire safety. In October 2006, the Fire Safety (Scotland) Regulations 2006 (SSI 2006/456) also came into effect. Legislation in Scotland relating to fire and rescue services and fire safety comes under the auspices of the Scottish Government.

In Northern Ireland, the equivalent legislation is the Fire and Rescue Services (Northern Ireland) Order 2006 (SI 2006/1254) (NI9) (it is a statutory instrument).

== See also ==
- Fire services in the United Kingdom
- History of fire brigades in the United Kingdom
- United Kingdom cladding crisis

== Links to legislation ==
- The Fire Precautions (Hotels and Boarding Houses) Order 1972
- Health and Safety at Work Etc. Act 1974
- Fire Certificates (Special Premises) Regulations 1976
- "Fire Safety and Safety of Places of Sport Act 1987". opsi.gov.uk.
- "The Fire Precautions (Factories, Offices, Shops and Railway Premises) Regulations 1989". opsi.gov.uk.
- "The Fire Precautions (Sub-surface Railway Stations) Regulations 1989". opsi.gov.uk.
- "Fire Precautions (Workplace) Regulations 1997". opsi.gov.uk.
- "Management of Health and Safety at Work Regulations 1992". opsi.gov.uk.
- "Management of Health and Safety at Work Regulations 1999". opsi.gov.uk.
- "The Fire Precautions (Workplace)(Amendment) Regulations 1999". opsi.gov.uk.
- Council Directive 89/391/EEC of 12 June 1989 on the introduction of measures to encourage improvements in the safety and health of workers at work
- Council Directive 89/654/EEC of 30 November 1989 concerning the minimum safety and health requirements for the workplace (first individual directive within the meaning of Article 16 (1) of Directive 89/391/EEC)
- "The Dangerous Substances and Explosive Atmospheres Regulations 2002". opsi.gov.uk. Archived from the original on 1 January 2008.
- "Manufacture and Storage of Explosives Regulations 2002". opsi.gov.uk. Archived from the original on 1 January 2008.
- "Licensing Act 2003". opsi.gov.uk.
- "Regulatory Reform (Fire Safety) Order 2005". opsi.gov.uk.
