= Top Storey Club =

Nightclub in Bolton, Greater Manchester, England, notorious for a 1961 fire

Coordinates: 53.5807°N 2.4271°W

The Top Storey Club was a nightclub in Bolton, Lancashire, (since 1974 Greater Manchester,) England. It achieved notoriety for a fire which occurred on 1 May 1961 in which 19 people perished.

== The club ==
The club was located on Crown Street in Bolton and was on the top floors of an old mill warehouse building. From the street front, the building had three floors but the warehouse was built on a slope so the rear had eight floors looking out on to the River Croal which at this point ran in a brick-lined channel. The club was opened in December 1960 by Stanley Wilcock, who rented the building, using the lower floors for his business, making kitchen furniture. In March 1961, Wilcock sold his interest in the nightclub which occupied the top two floors of the warehouse to two Manchester businessmen; Denis Wilson and Richard Sorrensen. Wilcock retained the lower floors for his furniture business. The club was small with just a few tables where customers could sit and listen or dance to tape-recorded music. The maximum occupancy was about 200.

The owners of the building learnt of the nightclub's availability from an advertisement in the Bolton Evening News and were concerned the building would be unsuitable for such use. On 1 May 1961 at 10.35pm, one of the owners, Norman Balshaw went to the club and told Wilson and Sorrensen that the club was not to be continued, and they must vacate by 24 June.

== The fire ==
On the night of the fire, the club was quiet with it being a Monday. Between 20 and 25 people were in the club. At 11pm, less than half an hour after the visit by the owner, the manager Bill Bohannon smelt smoke. He went down the single wooden staircase, which was the only means of access and egress. Upon arriving at the ground floor, he saw smoke coming under the door leading to the furniture workshop. He kicked the door down and was confronted with a raging inferno. The intensity of the fire prevented him returning upstairs, but he managed to escape. This inferno quickly spread up the stairs towards the club. As there was no other means of escape, some customers took to jumping from the windows. The windows available were those at the back, where there was an eight-floor drop onto bricks by the river channel.

Bolton Fire Brigade arrived within three minutes, but were unable to enter due to the intense fire. It was not possible to access the back with ladders, due to the river, and the turntable ladder was not long enough to bridge the river to reach the upper floors. Bolton were backed up by fire engines from Leigh, Horwich (Lancashire County Fire Brigade) and Bury (Bury Fire Brigade). The blaze took 2.5 hours to bring under control and allow the firemen to bridge the burnt staircase with their ladders gaining access to the top floors. The scene was, as one fireman said, “horrific,” with 14 people dead in the club. Of those in the club at the time of the fire, the manager Bill Bohannon escaped, 14 died in the club, five died from jump injuries and two, maybe three, jumped and survived. The number is not clear due to difficulty in accessing the river channel and a comment that someone who had jumped was seen running away. Police Constable Brian White said he only saw three jump from the building. The fatalities included 11 men and eight women. Denis Wilson and Richard Sorrensen, the owners, and Sheila Bohannon, wife of the manager, were among those who perished in the fire.

== Inquest ==
At the inquest, ex-club owner Stanley Wilcock gave evidence of there being a door behind the bar. This was an inward opening loading bay door, which would have given access to the outside front of the building and a drop of 2 floors, but the fitting of a false dance floor in the club prevented it from opening. It was disclosed the door could be opened but it needed to be lifted over the false floor for it to open, something customers in their panic had never thought about. If this door had been opened all victims would probably have escaped. It was established that the blaze was so intense due to the highly flammable solvents and paints used in the furniture workshop. The cause of death was given as smoke inhalation. The fire never fully reached the top floor but the hot gases and smoke soon filled the whole building. Despite an investigation by the Police and Fire Brigade, no actual cause for the fire could be given and the Coroner recorded an open verdict.

== Aftermath ==
Following the fire, there was an outcry, and questions were asked in Parliament. The records of the questions and answers are held in the National Archives in Kew. The result was a change in the Licensing Act, namely the Licensing Act 1961, which required fire brigades to inspect clubs and requirements on owners to provide adequate exits and fire extinguishers. A new act, the Licensing Act 1964, also required all clubs to be inspected and a licence issued before they could open. The licence would include requirements on fire safety matters including exits, emergency lighting, maintenance and testing of equipment, etc and would set a maximum capacity. This was later incorporated into the Fire Precautions Act 1971 giving Fire Brigades powers to close sub-standard night clubs. In 2006 the Fire Precautions Act 1971 was withdrawn (replaced with the Regulatory Reform (Fire Safety) Order 2005 in England and Wales, and similar legislation in Scotland & Northern Ireland) and following subsequent changes to the Licensing Act, licenses can no longer set fire safety and capacity conditions – instead the Responsible Person is required to determine requirements through a Fire Risk Assessment although the fire service retain inspection and enforcement responsibility under the Regulatory Reform (Fire Safety) Order 2005 (and devolved equivalents) which still includes a power to close premises if and when they are brought to their attention or if picked up in an audit visit.

== Notes ==
Bill Bohannon, the manager of the club, who survived the fire, having suffered 20 per cent burns, died aged 84 in November 2013.

== See also ==
- List of nightclub fires
- History of fire safety legislation in the United Kingdom
- 1961 in the United Kingdom
