= Cinematograph Act 1952 =

Act of the Parliament of the United Kingdom

Cinematograph Act 1952 (Note: Section 10(1).)
- Act of Parliament
- Parliament of the United Kingdom
- Long title: An Act to extend and amend the Cinematograph Act, 1909, and, as respects cinematograph entertainments, to modify the enactments relating to music and dancing licences.
- Citation: 15 & 16 Geo. 6 & 1 Eliz. 2. c. 68
- Territorial extent: England and Wales; Scotland; (Note: Section 10(2).)

Dates
- Royal assent: 30 October 1952
- Commencement: 1 January 1956 (Note: Section 10(3). The Cinematograph Act 1952 (Commencement in England and Wales) Instrument 1955 (SI 1955/1128) and Cinematograph Act 1952 (Commencement in Scotland) Instrument 1955 (SI 1955/1124).)
- Repealed: 26 June 1985
Other legislation
Amends	Cinematograph Act 1909
Amended by	Courts Act 1971; Fire Precautions Act 1971; Cinematograph (Amendment) Act 1982
Repealed by	Cinemas Act 1985

Status: Repealed

Text of statute as originally enacted

The Cinematograph Act 1952 (15 & 16 Geo. 6 & 1 Eliz. 2. c. 68) was an act of the Parliament of the United Kingdom.

This act extended and amended the Cinematograph Act 1909 (9 Edw. 7. c. 30) relating to cinematograph entertainments, and modified it relating to music and dancing licences.

== Subsequent developments ==
The whole act was repealed by section 24(2) of, and schedule 3 to, the Cinemas Act 1985, which came into force on 26 June 1985.
