= Safety of Sports Grounds Act 1975 =

Act of the Parliament of the United Kingdom

Safety of Sports Grounds Act 1975 (Note: Section 19(1).)
- Act of Parliament
- Parliament of the United Kingdom
- Long title: An Act to make provision for safety at sports stadia and other sports grounds.
- Citation: 1975 c. 52
- Territorial extent: England and Wales; Scotland; (Note: Section 19(2)–(5).)

Dates
- Royal assent: 1 August 1975
- Commencement: 1 September 1975 (Note: The Safety of Sports Grounds Act 1975 (Commencement) Order 1975 (SI 1975/1375).)
Other legislation
Amended by	Fire Safety and Safety of Places of Sport Act 1987

Status: Amended

Text of statute as originally enacted

Revised text of statute as amended

Text of the Safety of Sports Grounds Act 1975 as in force today (including any amendments) within the United Kingdom, from legislation.gov.uk.

The Safety of Sports Grounds Act 1975 (c. 52) is an act of the Parliament of the United Kingdom which allows the Secretary of State for Digital, Culture, Media and Sport to designate a sports ground that can accommodate more than 10,000 spectators (5,000 spectators for grounds that host the Premier League or English Football League matches) to require a safety certificate, in order for them to admit spectators into the ground.

== Provisions ==
=== Section 1 - Safety certificates for large sports stadia ===
This section outlines that any sports ground that has accommodation of more than 10,000 spectators (according to the opinion of the Secretary of State), may be designated as a 'sports ground' and as a result, requires a 'safety certificate'.

The Secretary of State may estimate 'by any means which he considers appropriate' how many people a sports ground can accommodate and may require the information to be provided by a person from the sports ground.

A safety certificate may be issued by the local authority, outlining what activities take place in the sports ground.

=== Section 2 - Contents of safety certificates ===
This section outlines that a safety certificate will have terms and conditions, determined by the local authority, as to what is necessary for reasonable safety at the sports ground, when it is being used for a specified activity or activities.

=== Section 3 - Applications for certificates ===
This section outlines that when a person applies for a safety certificate, the local authority has a duty is to determine whether the applicant of a safety certificate is able to prevent the terms and conditions of the safety certificate from being contravened. This person is known as a 'qualified person'.

=== Section 4 - Amendment etc. of certificates ===
This section outlines that the local authority can amend or replace a safety certificate, if they consider it appropriate.

=== Section 5 - Appeals ===
This section outlines that a qualified person may appeal the decision that they are not considered a qualified person, including on grounds 'other than a determination that he is not a qualified person'.

== See also ==
- Sports Grounds Safety Authority
