= Offices, Shops and Railway Premises Act 1963 =

Act of the Parliament of the United Kingdom

Offices, Shops and Railway Premises Act 1963 (Note: Section 91(1).)
- Act of Parliament
- Parliament of the United Kingdom
- Long title: An Act to make fresh provision for securing the health, safety and welfare of persons employed to work in office or shop premises and provision for securing the health, safety and welfare of persons employed to work in certain railway premises; to amend certain provisions of the Factories Act 1961; and for purposes connected with the matters aforesaid.
- Citation: 1963 c. 41
- Introduced by: John Hare, Minister of Labour, 15 November 1962 (Commons)
- Territorial extent: England and Wales; Scotland; (Note: Section 91(3).)

Dates
- Royal assent: 31 July 1963
- Commencement: from 18 February 1964 (Note: Section 91(2).)
Other legislation
Amends	Public Health Act 1936; Shops Act 1950; London County Council (General Powers) Act 1958; Factories Act 1961
Repeals/revokes	Offices Act 1960
Amended by	London Government Act 1963; Singapore Act 1966; Fire Precautions Act 1971; Workplace (Health, Safety and Welfare) Regulations 1992; Statute Law (Repeals) Act 1993; Health and Safety (Young Persons) Regulations 1997
Relates to	Factories Act 1961

Status: Amended

Text of statute as originally enacted

Text of the Offices, Shops and Railway Premises Act 1963 as in force today (including any amendments) within the United Kingdom, from legislation.gov.uk.

The Offices, Shops and Railway Premises Act 1963 (c. 41) is an act of the Parliament of the United Kingdom. At the time of its passage, the act was intended to extend the protection of workplace health, safety and welfare under the Factories Act 1961 to other employees in Great Britain. Though as of 2008 some of it remains in force, it has largely been superseded by the Health and Safety at Work etc. Act 1974 and regulations made under it.

Breach of the residual provisions is still a crime punishable on summary conviction in the magistrates' court by a fine of up to £400 or, on indictment in the Crown Court, imprisonment for up to two years and an unlimited fine.

In the event of damage arising from a breach of the act, there may be civil liability for breach of statutory duty. Though no such liability is stipulated by the act itself, none is excluded and the facts could be such as to give rise to a cause of action in that tort. A breach not actionable in itself may be evidential towards a claim for common law negligence. In particular, a criminal conviction may be given in evidence.

== Background ==
The act stemmed from the 1949 Gowers Report which had already led to the Mines and Quarries Act 1954, Agriculture (Safety, Health and Welfare Provisions) Act 1956 and Factories Act 1961. The 1963 Act extended protection to a further 8 million employees.

== Health, safety and welfare of employees (general provisions) ==
Sections 4 to 16 defined general broad requirements for safe and healthy workplace working conditions:

4. Cleanliness
5. Overcrowding
6. Temperature
7. Ventilation
8. Lighting
9. Sanitary conveniences
10. Washing facilities
11. Supply of drinking water
12. Accommodation for clothing
13. Sitting facilities
14. Seating for sedentary work
15. Eating facilities
16. Construction and maintenance of floors, stairways and passageways.

These provisions were repealed and superseded, as far as they applied to "workplaces", by the Workplace (Health, Safety and Welfare) Regulations 1992 with effect from 1 January 1993 for new workplaces and 1 January 1996 for established workplaces. There is still a potential residual scope of application to "offices, shops and railway premises" that are not "workplaces" as the definition of "workplace" is in some ways limited.

Section 17 made requirements for the safeguarding of machinery but was repealed and superseded by the Provision and Use of Work Equipment Regulations 1992 between 1 January 1993 and 1 January 1997.

Section 18 prohibited persons under 18 from cleaning certain hazardous machinery but was repealed and superseded by the Health and Safety (Young Persons) Regulations 1997 on 3 March 1997.

Sections 20 to 22 gave the Secretary of State the power to make regulations under the act but these powers were repealed with the coming into force of the 1974 act.

Section 23 restricted manual lifting of weights that might cause injury but these requirements were repealed and superseded by the Manual Handling Operations Regulations 1992 on 1 January 1993.

== Bibliography ==
- [Various authors] (2007). Tolley's Health and Safety at Work Handbook 2008. London: Butterworths. ISBN 0754533182.
- Cullen, W. (1996). "The development of safety legislation" (PDF). Royal Academy of Engineering and Royal Society of Edinburgh Lecture. Royal Society of Edinburgh. Archived from the original (PDF) on 27 March 2009.
- Lord Mackay of Clashfern (ed.) (2004) Halsbury's Laws of England, 4th ed. reissue, Vol.20, "Health and Safety at Work"
- Ridley, J. R. & Channing, J. (2003). Safety at Work. London: Butterworth-Heinemann. ISBN 0750654937. (Google Books)
- Stranks, J. (2005). Health and Safety Law (5th ed.). London: Prentice Hall. ISBN 013197646X.
