= Open verdict =

Optional decision by a coroner's jury in England or Wales

The open verdict is an option open to a coroner's jury at an inquest in the legal system of England and Wales. The verdict means the jury confirms the death is suspicious, but is unable to reach any other verdicts open to them. Mortality studies consider it likely that the majority of open verdicts are recorded in cases of suicide where the intent of the deceased could not be proved, although the verdict is recorded in many other circumstances.

== Meaning ==
Two lord chief justices have cautioned an open verdict does not mean the jury has failed to do their duty of explaining the cause of death, but that in some cases, there is genuine doubt about the cause of death. However, the uncertainty explicit in the verdict has led many to regard it as an unsatisfactory one. Current legal guidance is to avoid open verdicts if possible:

an open verdict is thus only to be used in the last resort if there is insufficient evidence to enable the coroner or the jury to reach any other conclusions. The fact of there possibly being uncertainty as to other parts of the inquisition, for example as to the precise cause, time or place of death, does not authorise recording an open verdict if there is sufficient evidence to record how the deceased came by his death. In other words, the coroner or jury should not fail to reach a positive conclusion merely because there is some doubt on some minor point.

== Standard of proof ==
In an obiter dictum (legal opinion not forming part of the judgment) in the case of R v West London Coroner, ex parte Gray in 1986, the divisional court stated that the open verdict was, as with the verdicts of unlawful killing and suicide, required to be proved beyond a reasonable doubt. However, the fact of a verdict of suicide requires "some evidence of the deceased having intended to take his own life" means open verdicts are often recorded in cases where suicide is suspected, but the evidence of intent is lacking. For this reason some studies of suicides have also included those deaths in which open verdicts were recorded.

== Notable open verdicts ==
In May 1961, a fire broke out in the Top Storey Club in Bolton, Greater Manchester. Nineteen people died in the fire (fourteen in the fire and five who jumped from windows on the eighth floor) but despite an investigation by the police and fire brigade, no actual cause for the fire could be given and the coroner recorded an open verdict on all who died in the fire.

The 1972 inquest into the death by hanging of sailor Nigel Tetley returned an open verdict. The attending pathologist noted that the circumstances suggested masochistic sexual activity rather than suicide.

The 1978 death of Keith Moon, drummer for The Who, was given an open verdict, with the inquest being unable to determine if his death was accidental or the result of suicide.

In 1982, the jury returned an open verdict on the death of Helen Smith, a British nurse who had fallen to her death in Saudi Arabia during a party; this was interpreted as a rejection of the theory that Smith had accidentally fallen, and a victory for her father Ron Smith's claim that she had been killed.

In February 1997, actor Barry Evans was found dead in his home by police. The police discovered Evans' body in his living room after going to the house to tell him they had recovered his stolen car which had been reported missing the day before. The cause of his death has never been confirmed. The coroner found a blow to Evans' head and also found high levels of alcohol in his system. A short written will was found on a table next to his body, and a spilled packet of aspirin (bearing a pre-decimalisation price tag indicating that the pack was at least 26 years old) was found on the floor, although the coroner concluded that Evans had not taken any of these. An open verdict was eventually given. An 18-year-old man was arrested but later released without charge due to insufficient evidence.

Two successive inquests, in May 1981 and May 2004, have returned open verdicts on the victims of the New Cross house fire in which 13 black teenagers were killed by a fire at a birthday party. The families of the victims have long believed that the fire was started deliberately, possibly as a racist attack, and the verdict was interpreted as a rejection of that theory.

The inquest into the death of Jean Charles de Menezes, who was shot dead in 2005 by Metropolitan Police officers who mistakenly believed him to be a suicide bomber, returned an open verdict in December 2008. The coroner had specifically directed them that they were not able to return a verdict of unlawful killing, and left them the alternatives of the open verdict or ruling the killing lawful, and the verdict (together with the answers to an associated questionnaire given to the jury) was interpreted as a condemnation of the police.

The death of Bob Woolmer, an English cricket coach, on 18 March 2007 while coaching Pakistan during the World Cup was given an open verdict on 28 November 2007, with the inquest after hearing from more than 50 witnesses over five weeks being unable to determine whether his death was due to murder, natural causes or an accident.
