= Helen Smith (nurse) =

British nurse who died in Saudi Arabia

Helen Linda Smith (3 January 1956 – 20 May 1979) was a British nurse who died in suspicious circumstances in Jeddah, Saudi Arabia, after allegedly falling from a balcony during a party. Her father refused to accept that her death was an accident, and alleged that there was a conspiracy to conceal the truth.

Mr Smith's campaign led to changes in the rules concerning inquests to violent deaths of UK citizens occurring outside the country. Helen Smith's body was stored for thirty years before being cremated in 2009.

== Death ==
Following a party at the house of Richard Arnot and his wife Penny, the bodies of Helen (23) and Johannes Otten (35), a Dutch tugboat captain, were found in the street 70 feet below the Arnots' sixth floor balcony. Helen was found lying in the road clothed but with her underpants partly off and Johannes, whose underpants were around his thighs, was impaled upon the spiked railings surrounding the apartment block.

Also present at the Arnots' that night were Tim Hayter, a diver from New Zealand, a marine biologist named Jacques Texier, four German salvage operators and quite a number of other people who were never traced.

The presence of alcohol at the party in a "dry" country, and evidence given by Jacques Texier of a sexual encounter between Tim Hayter and Mrs Arnot at the time of the deaths, led to increased interest in the case, and the prosecution of Mrs Arnot by the Saudi authorities for "unlawful intercourse". Richard Arnot was sentenced to eighty strokes of the cane, to be administered in public, for illegally supplying alcohol – although the sentence was never carried out.

The official Saudi investigation into the incident concluded that the couple had fallen from the balcony while drunk, possibly after or during a sexual encounter. This conclusion was endorsed by the British Foreign Office.

== Campaign ==
Helen's father Ron Smith, a retired policeman, refused to accept the conclusion and embarked upon a lengthy campaign to expose what he considered to be a Saudi–British coverup.

At her father's insistence, Helen's body was left unburied for more than 30 years in storage at Leeds General Infirmary, thought to be the longest time a body has been stored without burial in the United Kingdom. Some six different post mortem examinations and forensic investigations were performed over this period, with varying conclusions.

The death of Helen Smith and her father's subsequent campaign led to a change in the rules regarding inquests into violent or unnatural deaths abroad. The West Yorkshire Coroner, Philip Gill had declined to hold an inquest, concluding that the case was outside his jurisdiction. Although his decision was upheld by the High Court, in July 1982 the Court of Appeal ordered the inquest to go ahead. The ruling imposed a duty on coroners to investigate deaths abroad where the body was returned to England and Wales. The hearing was billed as the inquest of the century but failed to give Ron Smith the closure he had wanted; the jury returned an open verdict. The 1982 ruling affected thousands of cases and was later cited as a reason for the decision to hold an inquest into the death of Diana, Princess of Wales. Human Rights barrister Geoffrey Robertson wrote about his time acting for Ron Smith, Helen's father, at the inquest into her death. Robertson theorises that Helen did not fall from the balcony while having sex, but was possibly sexually assaulted before her death. "Usher (the pathologist) thought they (genital injuries) indicated rape, and suggested some violent sexual activity had taken place". Robertson also states in his book that pathologists "Dalgaard, Usher & Green.......produced evidence which precluded a fall from a height".

== Funeral in 2009 ==
Although her father had insisted that Helen would not receive a funeral until the full circumstances of her death had been uncovered, following discussions with Helen's mother he agreed to hold a funeral while both of them were still alive. Helen Smith's remains were cremated on 9 November 2009, over 30 years after her death. Her ashes were scattered on Ilkley Moor. Ron Smith died on 15 April 2011.
