= Cinematograph Act 1909 =

Act of the Parliament of the United Kingdom

Cinematograph Act 1909 (Note: Section 10.)
- Act of Parliament
- Parliament of the United Kingdom
- Long title: An Act to make better provision for securing safety at Cinematograph and other Exhibitions.
- Citation: 9 Edw. 7. c. 30
- Territorial extent: United Kingdom

Dates
- Royal assent: 25 November 1909
- Commencement: 1 January 1910
- Repealed: 27 June 1985
Other legislation
Amended by	Local Government Act 1933; Local Government (Scotland) Act 1947; Cinematograph Act 1952; Police Act 1964; Police (Scotland) Act 1967; Cinematograph (Amendment) Act 1982
Repealed by	Cinemas Act 1985

Status: Repealed

Text of statute as originally enacted

The Cinematograph Act 1909 (9 Edw. 7. c. 30) was an act of the Parliament of the United Kingdom. It was the first primary legislation in the UK which specifically regulated the film industry. It unintentionally provided the legal basis for film censorship, leading to the establishment of the British Board of Film Censors in 1912.

== Origins ==
During the 1890s and 1900s, most film exhibition took place in temporary venues such as fairgrounds, music halls and hastily converted shops (so-called 'penny gaffs'). The film then in use was made from the highly flammable cellulose nitrate base. Combined with limelight illumination, this created a significant safety hazard, resulting in a number of fatal fires. After the Bazar de la Charité fire in Paris in 1897, where 126 people lost their lives, the London County Council issued specific fire regulations to licensed theatres in 1898 as a forerunner to the Cinematograph Act.

The 1909 Act specified a strict building code which required, amongst other things, that the projector be enclosed within a fire resisting enclosure. All commercial cinemas (defined as any business which admitted members of the public to see films in exchange for payment) had to comply with these regulations. In order to enforce this each cinema had to be inspected and licensed by the local authority. The Act was amended in the wake of the 1929 Glen Cinema Disaster in order to give local authorities more powers to regulate the number of emergency exits and insist on other safety measures.

== Legal basis of censorship ==
In the following year, the owner of the London Bridge Picture Palace and Cinematograph Theatre, in South London, was prosecuted under Section 2 of the Act after he defied a condition of the licence issued by the local authority, the London County Council, by opening on a Sunday (27 February 1910). In the appeal hearing which resulted, the cinema owner argued that the intention of the 1909 Act was simply to ensure health and safety, and that authorities had no legal power to attach unrelated conditions to cinemas' licences. The LCC won the appeal, which established the precedent that the purpose of restrictions on a cinema licence did not have to be restricted to fire prevention.

In the aftermath of this case, local authorities across the country began to censor the content of films, using their licensing powers under the 1909 Act. This concerned the film industry, which was worried that inconsistent censorship policies would undermine it: under this ad hoc system, a film-maker had no way of knowing the size of his potential market (i.e. how many authorities would allow or ban his film), and cinema owners in areas with strict censorship policies would suffer financially compared to those in more liberal towns.

The result was the creation of the British Board of Film Censors in 1912, a private company which examined and certified films according to nationally agreed criteria. It was financed by the fees paid by film-makers to the BBFC to have their films examined. Councils began to issue cinema licences with a provision stating that they may show only films which had been passed by the BBFC, rather than censoring films themselves.

Although the act itself was later superseded, its provisions remain the legal basis on which the content of films for cinema exhibition is regulated in the UK. There are occasionally high-profile cases in which a local authority overrules a BBFC decision within its given jurisdiction, either to raise the certificate or ban outright films the Board has passed, or to allow screening of films it has not. The BBFC was given statutory powers for the first time in 1985, when it was designated as the classifying authority under the Video Recordings Act 1984, in respect of most commercial video recordings sold or hired in the UK. But these powers do not affect theatrical exhibition, the legal regulation of which remains with local authorities.

In the Irish Free State, the Censorship of Films Act 1923 established an Official Censor of Films and removed the right of local authorities to attach censorship conditions to cinema licences.

== Subsequent developments ==
The whole act was repealed fort the Republic of Ireland by the Fire Services Act 1981.

The whole act was repealed for the United Kingdom by section 24(2) of, and schedule 3 to, the Cinemas Act 1985, which came into force on 27 June 1985.
