= Fire Safety Act 2021 =

Act of the Parliament of the United Kingdom

Fire Safety Act 2021 (Note: Section 4(1).)
- Act of Parliament
- Parliament of the United Kingdom
- Long title: An Act to make provision about the application of the Regulatory Reform (Fire Safety) Order 2005 where a building contains two or more sets of domestic premises; and to confer power to amend that order in future for the purposes of changing the premises to which it applies.
- Citation: 2021 c. 24
- Introduced by: Priti Patel (Commons); Lord Greenhalgh (Lords)
- Territorial extent: England and Wales

Dates
- Royal assent: 29 April 2021
- Commencement: 29 April 2021 (section 4); 29 June 2021 (section 2); 16 May 2022 (section 3) (Note: The Fire Safety Act 2021 (Commencement) (England) Regulations 2022 (SI 2022/544).); Wales: 1 October 2021 (Note: The Fire Safety Act 2021 (Commencement) (Wales) Regulations 2021. (SI 2021/1092]]).); England and Wales: 16 May 2022 (section 1); (Note: Section 4(2)–(6).)
Other legislation
Amends	Regulatory Reform (Fire Safety) Order 2005

Status: Current legislation

History of passage through Parliament

Text of statute as originally enacted

Revised text of statute as amended

The Fire Safety Act 2021 (c. 24) is an act of the Parliament of the United Kingdom.

== Background ==
The legislation arose out of the 2017 Grenfell Tower fire and relates to fire safety in buildings in England and Wales with two or more domestic residences, making changes to the Regulatory Reform (Fire Safety) Order 2005 (the "Fire Safety Order"). It was sponsored by the Home Office.

The bill received royal assent on 29 April 2021.

== Provisions ==
The act includes the following provisions:

- those responsible for the fire safety of a relevant building will be required to share information about its external walls with the local fire and rescue service
- building owners or managers will have to inspect flat entrance doors annually and lifts monthly, notifying the local fire and rescue service if there are any faults with the lifts
- residents of buildings with two or more flats will need to have access to evacuation and fire safety instructions provided by the building owner or manager
- a public register of fire risk assessments will be established.

There is provision (in section 2) for the Secretary of State and the Welsh Ministers to make future changes to the types of premises covered by the Fire Safety Order without further primary legislation.

== Reception ==
The act was criticised by the shadow fire minister and Labour MP Sarah Jones over the lack of protections for leaseholders. She also suggested the government should have done more to place the burden of responsibility on developers.

The Fire Protection Association welcomed the legislation, noting that it "makes good a long-standing issue about who is responsible for the fire safety of communal doors, external walls and anything attached, such as balconies", but also regretting that provision was not made to exclude a requirement for leaseholders to pay for remedial works to remove dangerous cladding from their buildings.
