= Cinemas Act 1985 =

Act of the Parliament of the United Kingdom

Cinemas Act 1985 (Note: Section 25(1).)
- Act of Parliament
- Parliament of the United Kingdom
- Long title: An Act to consolidate the Cinematograph Acts 1909 to 1982 and certain related enactments, with an amendment to give effect to a recommendation of the Law Commission.
- Citation: 1985 c. 13
- Territorial extent: England and Wales; Scotland; (Note: Section 25(3).)

Dates
- Royal assent: 27 March 1985
- Commencement: 27 June 1985 (Note: Section 25(2).)
Other legislation
Amends	See § Repealed enactments
Repeals/revokes	See § Repealed enactments
Amended by	Statute Law (Repeals) Act 1993; Local Government (Wales) Act 1994; Local Government etc. (Scotland) Act 1994; Deregulation and Contracting Out Act 1994; Licensing Act 2003; Communications Act 2003; Courts Act 2003

Status: Amended

Text of statute as originally enacted

Revised text of statute as amended

Text of the Cinemas Act 1985 as in force today (including any amendments) within the United Kingdom, from legislation.gov.uk.

The Cinemas Act 1985 (c. 13) is an act of the Parliament of the United Kingdom that consolidated enactments related to film exhibitions in England and Wales and Scotland, with an amendment to give effect to a recommendation of the Law Commission.

== Provisions ==
=== Repealed enactments ===
Section 24(2) of the act repealed 17 enactments, listed in schedule 3 to the act.

Enactments repealed by section 24(2)
Citation	Short title	Extent of repeal
9 Edw. 7. c. 30	Cinematograph Act 1909	The whole act.
22 & 23 Geo. 5. c. 51	Sunday Entertainments Act 1932	Section 1.
22 & 23 Geo. 5. c. 51	Sunday Entertainments Act 1932	In section 4, paragraph (a), the words " cinematograph entertainment or" and the words " allowed under this Act or ".
22 & 23 Geo. 5. c. 51	Sunday Entertainments Act 1932	In section 5, the definition of " cinematograph entertainment ".
23 & 24 Geo. 5. c. 12	Children and Young Persons Act 1933	In section 12(3), the words " under the Cinematograph Act, 1909, or ".
1 Edw. 8 & 1 Geo. 6. c. 37	Children and Young Persons (Scotland) Act 1937	In section 23(3), the words " under the Cinematograph Act, 1909, or ".
15 & 16 Geo. 6 & 1 Eliz. 2. c. 68	Cinematograph Act 1952	The whole act.
1963 c. 33	London Government Act 1963	In section 52, subsection (2) and, in subsection (3), the words from " and with " to the end.
1963 c. 33	London Government Act 1963	In Schedule 12, in paragraph 17(1), the words "the Cinematograph Act 1909 or ", in paragraph 18, paragraph (b), and paragraph 19(5).
1966 c. 42	Local Government Act 1966	In Schedule 3, in Part II, the entry numbered 12.
1966 c. 51	Local Government (Scotland) Act 1966	In Schedule 4, in Part II, the entry numbered 10.
1967 c. 19	Private Places of Entertainment (Licensing) Act 1967	In section 2(3), the words from the beginning to " such enactment; and ".
1971 c. 40	Fire Precautions Act 1971	Section 12(12).
1972 c. 19	Sunday Cinema Act 1972	The whole act.
1972 c. 70	Local Government Act 1972	Section 204(5).
1973 c. 65	Local Government (Scotland) Act 1973	Section 188(3)(a).
1973 c. 65	Local Government (Scotland) Act 1973	In Schedule 24, paragraph 33.
1977 c. 45	Criminal Law Act 1977	Section 53(4).
1982 c. 33	Cinematograph (Amendment) Act 1982	The whole act.
1984 c. 12	Telecommunications Act 1984	In Schedule 4, paragraphs 11 and 85.
1984 c. 46	Cable and Broadcasting Act 1984	In Schedule 5, paragraphs 3 and 42.

== Subsequent developments ==
Paragraphs 4 and 5 of schedule 2 to the act were repealed by section 81 of, and schedule 17 to, the Deregulation and Contracting Out Act 1994. The act ceased to have effect in England and Wales on 24 November 2005 by virtue of paragraph 95 of schedule 6 to the Licensing Act 2003; sections 3(1A), 9, 17, 18 and 19(3)(a) were also formally repealed by schedule 7 to that act from the same date. The act continues to apply in Scotland.
