= Workplace (Health, Safety and Welfare) Regulations 1992 =

SARDAR

- Statutory Instrument
- Parliament of the United Kingdom
- Citation: SI 1992/3004
- Introduced by: Patrick McLoughlin (Department of Employment)
- Territorial extent: United Kingdom; overseas

Dates
- Made: 1 December 1992
- Commencement: 1 January 1996; 30 years ago
Other legislation
Made under	Health and Safety at Work etc. Act 1974
Transposes	Directive 89/654/EEC

Status: Current legislation

Text of statute as originally enacted

The Workplace (Health, Safety and Welfare) Regulations 1992 (SI 1992/3004), a United Kingdom statutory instrument, stipulate general requirements on accommodation standards for nearly all workplaces. The regulations implemented European Union directive 89/654/EEC on minimum safety and health requirements for the workplace and repealed and superseded much of the Factories Act 1961 and Offices, Shops and Railway Premises Act 1963.

Since 31 December 1995, all new and existing workplaces have had to comply with these regulations.

Breach of the regulations by an employer, controller of work premises or occupier of a factory is a crime, punishable on summary conviction or on indictment with an unlimited fine. Either an individual or a corporation can be punished and sentencing practice is published by the Sentencing Guidelines Council. Enforcement is the responsibility of the Health and Safety Executive (HSE) or in some cases, local authorities.

The HSE publishes a code of practice on implementing the regulations. Though a breach of the code creates neither civil nor criminal liability in itself, it could be evidential as to either. The regulations do not provide any rights of action for members of the public.

== Premises to which regulations apply ==
The regulations apply to all workplaces as well as ships, construction sites or mines and quarries. The regulations have limited application to temporary workplaces, transport and agriculture (reg.3). They do not apply in respect of exceptions in the EU directive:

- Stability and solidity;
- Electrical installations;
- Emergency routes and exits;
- Fire detection and fire fighting;
- Thermal insulation; and
- First aid rooms or equipment.

The Secretary of State for Defence may exempt premises on grounds of national security (reg.26).

== Requirements ==
The regulations impose requirements with respect to:

- Maintenance of premises (reg.5);
- Ventilation of enclosed workplaces (reg.6);
- Maintenance of a "reasonable" temperature indoors and the provision of thermometers (reg.7);
- Suitable and sufficient lighting, including emergency lighting, with a presumption in favour of daylight (reg.8); recommendations on the minimum lighting requirements for various tasks are set out in supporting guidance issued by the HSE.
- Cleanliness of the workplace, furniture, furnishings and fittings; the ease of cleaning of floors, walls and ceilings; and the prevention of accumulation of waste (reg.9);
- Room dimensions and space in rooms unoccupied by persons, furniture, fittings or plant (reg.10, Sch.1/ Pt.I);
- Workstations, including those outdoors, and the provision of suitable seats (reg.11);
- The condition of floors (reg.12);
- Routes for pedestrians or vehicles (regs.12, 17);
- Protection from falling objects and from persons falling from a height or falling into a dangerous substance (reg.13);
- Material or guarding of windows and other transparent or translucent walls, doors or gates and to them being easily visible (regulation 14);
- The way in which windows, skylights or ventilators are opened and the position they are left in when open (reg.15);
- The ability to clean windows and skylights (reg.16);
- The construction of doors and gates, including the fitting of necessary safety devices (reg.18);
- Escalators and moving walkways (regulation 19);
- Sanitary conveniences (reg.20, Sch.1/ Pt.II);
- Washing facilities (reg.21);
- Supply of drinking water and of cups or other drinking vessels (reg.22);
- Suitable storage for clothing and of facilities for changing clothing (regs.23, 24); and
- Facilities for rest and for eating meals (reg.25).

== Northern Ireland ==
The provisions were simultaneously extended to Northern Ireland by the Workplace (Health, Safety and Welfare) Regulations (Northern Ireland) 1993, made under the Health and Safety at Work (Northern Ireland) Order 1978.

== Bibliography ==
- [Various authors] (2007). Tolley's Health and Safety at Work Handbook 2008. London: Butterworths. ISBN 0754533182.
- HSE (2004). Workplace Health, Safety and Welfare. Workplace (Health, Safety and Welfare) Regulations 1992 - Approved Code of Practice and guidance. Vol. L24. HSE Books. ISBN 0717604136.
- Office of Public Sector Information (1992). "Workplace (Health, Safety and Welfare) Regulations 1992 - Explanatory Note".
- Stranks, J. (2005). Health and Safety Law (5th ed.). London: Prentice Hall. pp. p.301. ISBN 013197646X.
