= List of statutory instruments of the United Kingdom, 1955 =

This is an incomplete list of statutory instruments of the United Kingdom in 1955.

== Statutory instruments ==
=== 1-499 ===
- Parliamentary Constituencies (Scotland) (West Stirlingshire and Stirling and Falkirk Burghs) Order 1955 (SI 1955/22)
- Parliamentary Constituencies (Scotland) (Glasgow Bridgeton, Glasgow Provan and Glasgow Shettleston) Order 1955 (SI 1955/23)
- Parliamentary Constituencies (Scotland) (Edinburgh Central and Edinburgh Pentlands) Order 1955 (SI 1955/24)
- Parliamentary Constituencies (Scotland) (Glasgow Scotstoun, Glasgow Hillhead and Glasgow Woodside) Order 1955 (SI 1955/25)
- Parliamentary Constituencies (Scotland) (Glasgow Pollok, Glasgow Craigton, Glasgow Govan and Glasgow Gorbals) Order 1955 (SI 1955/26)
- Parliamentary Constituencies (Scotland) (East Aberdeenshire, West Aberdeenshire, Aberdeen North and Aberdeen South) Order 1955 (SI 1955/27)
- Parliamentary Constituencies (Scotland) (Edinburgh North and Edinburgh West) Order 1955 (SI 1955/28)
- Parliamentary Constituencies (Scotland) (Bute and North Ayrshire and Central Ayrshire) Order 1955 (SI 1955/29)
- Parliamentary Constituencies (Scotland) (Midlothian, Roxburgh, Selkirk and Peebles and Edinburgh East) Order 1955 (SI 1955/30)
- Parliamentary Constituencies (Scotland) (Glasgow Springburn, Glasgow Central and Glasgow Kelvingrove) Order 1955 (SI 1955/31)
- Consular Conventions (Income Tax) (Kingdom of Norway) Order 1955 (SI 1955/156)
- Consular Conventions (Income Tax) (United States of America) Order 1955 (SI 1955/157)
- Consular Conventions (Income Tax) (Kingdom of Sweden) Order 1955 (SI 1955/158)
- Consular Conventions (Income Tax) (French Republic) Order 1955 (SI 1955/159)
- Consular Conventions (Income Tax) (Kingdom of Greece) Order 1955 (SI 1955/160)
- Consular Conventions (Income Tax) (United States of Mexico) Order 1955 (SI 1955/161)
- Singapore Colony Order-in-Council 1955 (SI 1955/187)
- Coal Industry (Superannuation Scheme) (Winding Up, No. 8) Regulations 1955 (SI 1955/281)
- Savings Bank Annuities (Tables) Order 1955 (SI 1955/419)
- National Insurance and Industrial Injuries (Luxembourg) Order 1955 (SI 1955/420)
- Consular Conventions (United States of Mexico) Order 1955 (SI 1955/425)
- Police Pensions Regulations 1955 (SI 1955/480)
- Police Pensions (Scotland) Regulations 1955 (SI 1955/485)

=== 500-999 ===
- Transfer of Functions (Iron and Steel) Order 1955 (SI 1955/876)
- Motor Vehicles (Construction and Use) (Track Laying Vehicles) Regulations 1955 (SI 1955/990)

=== 1000-1499 ===
- Local Government Superannuation (Benefits) Amendment Regulations 1955 (SI 1955/1041)
- Cinematograph (Safety) (Scotland) Regulations 1955 (SI 1955/1125)
- Cinematograph (Safety) Regulations 1955 (SI 1955/1129)
- Double Taxation Relief (Taxes on Income) (Isle of Man) Order 1955 (SI 1955/1205)
- International Organisations (Immunities and Privileges of the Commission for Technical Co-operation in Africa South of the Sahara) Order 1955 (SI 1955/1208)
- Coal Industry (Superannuation Scheme) (Winding Up, No. 9) Regulations 1955 (SI 1955/1345)
- Boarding-Out of Children Regulations 1955 (SI 1955/1377)
- National Insurance (Modification of Trustee Savings Banks Pensions) Regulations 1955 (SI 1955/1472)
- Superannuation (Local Government and National Health Service) Interchange Rules 1955 (SI 1955/1494)
- Official Secrets (Prohibited Place) Order 1955 (SI 1955/1497) (S. 136)

=== 1500-1999 ===
- Indiarubber Regulations 1955 (SI 1955/1626)
- Revision of the Army and Air Force Acts (Transitional Provisions) Act 1955 (Appointed Day) Order 1955 (SI 1955/1807)
- London Cab Order 1955 (SI 1955/1853)
- Commonwealth Telegraphs (Cable and Wireless Ltd. Pension) Regulations 1955 (SI 1955/1893)
- Cinematograph (Children) (No. 2) Regulations 1955 (SI 1955/1909)
- International Finance Corporation Order 1955 SI 1955/1954
- Whaling Industry (Ship) Regulations 1955 (SI 1955/1973)
- Slaughter of Animals (Prevention of Cruelty) (Scotland) Regulations 1955 (SI 1955/1993)

== See also ==
- List of statutory instruments of the United Kingdom
