= Factories Act 1961 =

Act of the Parliament of the United Kingdom

Factories Act 1961 (Note: Section 185(1).)
- Act of Parliament
- Parliament of the United Kingdom
- Long title: An Act to consolidate the Factories Acts, 1937 to 1959, and certain other enactments relating to the safety, health and welfare of employed persons.
- Citation: 9 & 10 Eliz. 2. c. 34
- Introduced by: David Maxwell Fyfe, 1st Earl of Kilmuir, Lord Chancellor, 28 March 1961
- Territorial extent: England and Wales; Scotland (Note: Section 185(3).)

Dates
- Royal assent: 22 June 1961
- Commencement: 1 April 1961 (Note: Section 185(2).)
Other legislation
| Amends | See § Repealed enactments |
| Repeals/revokes | See § Repealed enactments |
| Amended by | Offices, Shops and Railway Premises Act 1963; London Government Act 1963; Banking and Financial Dealings Act 1971; Criminal Justice Act 1972; Statute Law (Repeals) Act 1974; Statute Law (Repeals) Act 1986; Wages Act 1986; Workplace (Health, Safety and Welfare) Regulations 1992; Trade Union Reform and Employment Rights Act 1993; Statute Law (Repeals) Act 1993 |
| Relates to | Offices, Shops and Railway Premises Act 1963 |

Status: Amended

Text of statute as originally enacted

Text of the Factories Act 1961 as in force today (including any amendments) within the United Kingdom, from legislation.gov.uk.

The Factories Act 1961 (9 & 10 Eliz. 2. c. 34) is an act of the Parliament of the United Kingdom. At the time of its passage, the act consolidated much legislation on workplace health, safety and welfare in Great Britain. Though as of 2008 some of it remains in force, it has largely been superseded by the Health and Safety at Work etc. Act 1974 and regulations made under it.

However, the act continues to have a legal importance as cases of chronic workplace exposure to hazards such as industrial noise, as in the Nottinghamshire and Derbyshire deafness litigation, or carcinogens often extend back in time beyond the current legislation.

Breach of the residual provisions is still a crime punishable on summary conviction in a magistrates' court by a fine of up to £20,000 or, on indictment in the Crown Court, imprisonment for up to two years and an unlimited fine.

In the event of damage arising from a breach of the act, there may be civil liability for breach of statutory duty. Though no such liability is stipulated by the act itself, none is excluded and the facts could be such as to give rise to a cause of action in that tort. A breach not actionable in itself may be evidential towards a claim for common law negligence. In particular, a criminal conviction may be given in evidence.

== Background ==
The act was the final consolidation of a line of legislation under Factory Acts that began in 1802. In particular, it consolidated the 1937 and 1959 acts. The acts were widely regarded as ineffective in practice. Section 14 of the 1961 Act required the guarding of all dangerous parts of machinery but a sequence of judicial decisions under the earlier Acts had restricted the scope of what was "dangerous" only to include hazards that were reasonable foreseeable.

== Definition of "factory" ==
Section 175 of the act defines "factory" as premises in which persons are employed in manual labour in any process for or incidental to:

- Making any article or part of any article;
- Altering, repairing, ornamenting, finishing, cleaning, or washing, or breaking up or demolition of any article;
- Adapting any article for sale;
- Slaughtering of cattle, sheep, swine, goats, horses, asses or mules; or
- In some circumstances, confinement of such animals awaiting slaughter at other premises.

The act also defines certain other specific premises as "factories" such as laundries and printing works (s. 175(2)).

== Health (general provisions) ==
Sections 1 to 7 define general broad requirements for healthy factory working conditions:

1. Cleanliness;
2. Overcrowding;
3. Temperature;
4. Ventilation;
5. Lighting;
6. Drainage of floors; and
7. Sanitary conveniences.

These provisions were repealed and superseded, as far as they applied to "workplaces", by the Workplace (Health, Safety and Welfare) Regulations 1992 with effect from 1 January 1993 for new workplaces and 1 January 1996 for established workplaces. There is still a potential residual scope of application to "factories" that are not "workplaces" as the definition of "workplace" is in some ways limited.

Section 10A was added by the Employment Medical Advisory Service Act 1972 and gives powers to the Employment Medical Advisory Service to order medical examination and supervision of employees.

Section 11 gave the Minister of State, as of 2008 the minister at the Department for Work and Pensions, the power to order medical supervision though these powers have been largely superseded by powers granted to the Health and Safety Executive and other powers of the Minister to make orders by statutory instrument.

== Safety (general provisions) ==
Sections 12 to 39 defined specific requirements for machinery safety but many have been repealed and superseded.

=== Sections still in force ===
As of 2008, the following sections remain fully in force:

24 Secure fencing and handrails for teagle openings and doorways;
39 Water-sealed gasholders.

The following sections were repealed and superseded, as far as they applied to "workplaces", by the Workplace (Health, Safety and Welfare) Regulations 1992 with effect from 1 January 1993 for new workplaces and 1 January 1996 for established workplaces. There is still a potential residual scope of application to "factories" that are not "workplaces".

18 Dangerous substances
28 Construction and maintenance of floors and safe means of access.

=== Repealed and superseded sections ===
The following sections were repealed and superseded by the Provision and Use of Work Equipment Regulations 1992 between 1 January 1993 and 1 January 1997:

12 Prime movers; Transmission machinery; Other machinery; Provisions as to unfenced machinery;Construction and maintenance of fencing;Construction and sale of machinery; and
19 Self-acting machines.

The following sections were repealed and superseded by the Health and Safety (Young Persons) Regulations 1997 on 3 March 1997:

20 Cleaning of machinery by young persons; and Training and supervision of young persons working at dangerous machines.

The following sections were repealed and superseded by the Lifting Operations and Lifting Equipment Regulations 1998 on 5 December 1998:

22 Hoists and lifts – general;
26 Cranes and other lifting machines; and Chains, ropes and lifting tackle.

The following sections were repealed and superseded by the Confined Spaces Regulations 1997 on 5 December 1998:

23 Hoists and lifts used for carrying persons; and
30 Protection from dangerous fumes and lack of oxygen

The following section was revoked and superseded by Schedule 7 of the Dangerous Substances and Explosive Atmospheres Regulations 2002 on 9 December 2002.

31 Precautions with respect to explosive or inflammable dust, gas, vapour or substance.

The following sections were repealed in part and superseded by the Pressure Systems and Transportable Gas Containers Regulations 1989 on 1 July 1994:

32 Steam boilers – attachments and construction; and steam boilers – maintenance, examination and use.

The following sections were repealed and superseded by the Pressure Systems Safety Regulations 2000 on 21 February 2000:

34 Steam boilers – restrictions on entry; Steam receivers and steam containers; and< Air receivers.

Sections 40 to 52 applied to fire safety and were repealed in 1976 when the Fire Precautions Act 1971 was extended to require fire certificates for a wide class of works premises.

== Welfare (general provisions) ==
Sections 57 to 60 define general broad requirements for factory welfare:

57. Supply of drinking water;
58. Washing facilities;
59. Accommodation for clothing; and
60. Sitting facilities.

These provisions were repealed and superseded, as far as they applied to "workplaces", by the Workplace (Health, Safety and Welfare) Regulations 1992 with effect from 1 January 1993 for new workplaces and 1 January 1996 for established workplaces. There is still a potential residual scope of application to "factories" that are not "workplaces".

Section 61, first aid, has been repealed, as has section 62, power of minister to make regulations.

== Health, safety and welfare (special provisions and regulations) ==
Sections 63 to 79 defined many specific regulations such as forbidding eating in places where lead or arsenic was processed (s. 64), and forbidding women and young people from working at foundries with lead or zinc, or "mixing or pasting in connection with the manufacture or repair of electric accumulators" (s. 74). As of 2008, these have all been repealed and superseded by subsequent regulations save for section 69 where there is a residual power for an inspector from the Health and Safety Executive to restrict working in underground rooms in "factories" that are not "workplaces".

== Notification and investigation of accidents and industrial diseases ==
Sections 80 to 85 specified requirements for the statutory reporting of deaths, injuries and diseases that took place at work. As of 2008, these sections have all been repealed and superseded, especially by the Reporting of Injuries, Diseases and Dangerous Occurrences Regulations 1995.

== Employment of women and young persons ==
Sections 86 to 116 restricted the working hours of women and young people in factories. Some exceptions were allowed such as for women in management positions (s. 95). All these sections have been repealed, either by:

- Sex Discrimination Act 1986, which makes restrictions on women's work unlawful; or
- Employment Act 1989, which defines a new regime for the training and employment of young people.

== Enforcement ==
Enforcement originally lay with district councils (ss. 8–10, 53–56) but, as of 1974, general responsibility falls to the Health and Safety Executive though they are often able to delegate this to local authorities.

=== Repealed enactments ===
Section 183(2) of the act repealed 6 enactments, listed in the seventh schedule to the act.

| Citation | Short title | Extent of repeal |
|---|---|---|
| 16 & 17 Geo. 5. c. 37 | Lead Paint (Protection against Poisoning) Act 1926 | The whole act. |
| 26 Geo. 5 & 1 Edw. 8. c. 24 | Employment of Women and Young Persons Act 1936 | The whole act. |
| 1 Edw. 8 & 1 Geo. 6. c. 67 | Factories Act 1937 | The whole act. |
| 11 & 12 Geo. 6. c. 55 | Factories Act 1948 | The whole act. |
| 6 & 7 Eliz. 2. c. 70 | Slaughterhouses Act 1958 | Section seven. |
| 7 & 8 Eliz. 2. c. 67 | Factories Act 1959 | The whole act. |

== Factories Act (Northern Ireland) 1965 ==
Factories Act (Northern Ireland) 1965 (Note: Section 183.)
- Act of Parliament
- Parliament of Northern Ireland
- Long title: An Act to consolidate the Factories Acts (Northern Ireland) 1938 to 1959, and certain other enactments relating to the safety, health and welfare of employed persons.
- Citation: 1965 c. 20 (N.I.)
- Territorial extent: Northern Ireland

Dates
- Royal assent: 4 November 1965
- Commencement: 4 November 1965
Other legislation
| Amended by | Workplace (Health, Safety and Welfare) Regulations (Northern Ireland) 1993 |
| Relates to | Factories Act 1961 |

Status: Amended

Text of the Factories Act 1961 as in force today (including any amendments) within the United Kingdom, from legislation.gov.uk.

The Factories Act 1961 did not extend to Northern Ireland, but the Parliament of Northern Ireland enacted similar provisions in its Factories Act (Northern Ireland) 1965 (c. 20 (N.I.)), which consolidated earlier acts there. As with the British act, as of 2008 most of the provisions have been repealed and superseded by more modern legislation under the Health and Safety at Work (Northern Ireland) Order 1978 (SI 1978/1039) (NI 9) such as the Workplace (Health, Safety and Welfare) Regulations (Northern Ireland) 1993.

== Subsequent developments ==
Section 183(2) of, and schedule 7 to, the act, together with words in section 185(3), were repealed by section 1 of, and part XI of the schedule to, the Statute Law (Repeals) Act 1974, which came into force on 27 June 1974.

== Bibliography ==
- Various authors, Tolley's Health and Safety at Work Handbook 2008 (Butterworths 2007) ISBN 0-7545-3318-2
- Lord Mackay of Clashfern, Halsbury's Laws of England (4th edn 2004) Vol 20, "Health and Safety at Work"
- JR Ridley and J Channing, Safety at Work (Butterworth-Heinemann 2003) ISBN 0-7506-5493-7
- J Stranks, Health and Safety Law (5th edn Prentice Hall 2005) ISBN 0-13-197646-X
- W Cullen, The development of safety legislation (Royal Society of Edinburgh 1996)
