= Beds in sheds =

Substandard, often illegal housing in the UK

"Beds in sheds" refers to substandard and usually illegal housing in the United Kingdom, particularly in Greater London. It is characterised by garden sheds being converted into living accommodation for private rent.

Following the prevalence of "beds in sheds", Newham Council introduced compulsory licensing for residential landlords.
