= Factories Act 1948 =

Act of the Parliament of the United Kingdom

Factories Act 1948 (Note: Section 16(1).)
- Act of Parliament
- Parliament of the United Kingdom
- Long title: An Act to amend the Factories Act, 1937, and provide for matters consequential on the amendment of that Act.
- Citation: 11 & 12 Geo. 6. c. 55
- Territorial extent: United Kingdom

Dates
- Royal assent: 30 July 1948
- Commencement: 1 October 1948: Sections 1–5 and 11–14; 1 October 1950: Section 6; 30 July 1948: rest of act; (Note: Section 16(3).)
- Repealed: 1 April 1962
Other legislation
Amends	Factories Act 1937
Amended by	Factories Act 1959
Repealed by	Factories Act 1961
Relates to	Statutory Instruments Act 1946

Status: Repealed

Text of statute as originally enacted

The Factories Act 1948 (11 & 12 Geo. 6. c. 55) was an act of the Parliament of the United Kingdom passed in the United Kingdom by the Labour government of Clement Attlee. It was passed with the intention of safeguarding the health of workers. It extended the age limits for the medical examination of persons entering factory employment, while also including male workers in the regulations for providing seats and issuing extensive new building regulations.

Under the act, young persons under the age of eighteen became subject to medical examination not only on entry to the place of work, but annually thereafter. Certificates of fitness were also made a requirement for young people employed in the loading, unloading and coaling of ships and other kinds of work in ships on harbour or wet dock, engineering construction and building operations as well as for factory employees.

== Subsequent developments ==
The whole act was repealed by section 183(2) of, and the Seventh Schedule to, the Factories Act 1961 (9 & 10 Eliz. 2. c. 34), which came into force on 1 April 1962.

== See also ==
- Factories Act,1948, India
