= Regulatory Reform (Fire Safety) Order 2005 =

United Kingdom Statutory Instrument

Regulatory Reform (Fire Safety) Order 2005 (Note: Section 1(1).)
- Statutory Instrument
- Parliament of the United Kingdom
- Citation: SI 2005/1541
- Introduced by: Jim Fitzpatrick
- Territorial extent: England and Wales (Note: Section 1(4).)

Dates
- Made: 7 June 2006
- Commencement: 8 June 2006 (articles 1 and 52(1)(a); 1 April 2006 (rest of SI); (Note: Section 1(2)–(3).)

Other legislation
- Amends: Rent Act 1977; Zoo Licensing Act 1981; Fire Safety and Safety of Places of Sport Act 1987; Capital Allowances Act 2001
- Repeals/revokes: Fire Precautions Act 1971; Fire Precautions (Loans) Act 1973; Smoke Detectors Act 1991
- Made under: Regulatory Reform Act 2001
- Amended by: Regulatory Reform (Fire Safety) Subordinate Provisions Order 2006

Status: Amended

History of passage through Parliament

Text of statute as originally enacted

Text of the Regulatory Reform (Fire Safety) Order 2005 as in force today (including any amendments) within the United Kingdom, from legislation.gov.uk.

The Regulatory Reform (Fire Safety) Order 2005 (SI 2005/1541) is a statutory instrument applicable in England and Wales.

== Provisions ==
The order places the responsibility on individuals within an organisation to carry out risk assessments to identify, manage and reduce the risk of fire. The order became law on 7 June 2005 and came into force on 1 October 2006.

The order compelled councils to conduct fire risk assessments of buildings before and during major refurbishments.

Guidance for businesses is available in the form of 16 government-published documents, with general guidance, a five-step checklist and 12 documents pertaining specifically to a particular type of business premises. On 5 January 2016, responsibility for fire and rescue policy transferred from the Department for Communities and Local Government to the Home Office, who then became responsible for the guidance. The guidance does not normally apply to domestic premises.

Prior to the order, under the Fire Precautions Act 1971, all public and commercial buildings, and all non-single-household domestic dwellings (apart from houses in multiple occupation), were required to hold a valid fire safety certificate issued annually after an inspection by the Fire Service. This regime was replaced with assessment by third-party fire-risk assessors contracted by building owners and landlords, with no mandated timeframe for checks, and no mandated professional qualifications.

In 2013, the Fire Service found that 14% of risk assessments were non-compliant with the law, and in 2018 it was found that 500 out of 800 of the UK's fire risk assessors were not registered with accredited bodies.

== Commencement ==
The order took effect in 2006.

== Further developments ==
In 2010, the headquarters of the Department of Communities and Local Government was found to be in violation of the order.

== See also ==
- Fire services in the United Kingdom
