= Factories Act 1937 =

Act of the Parliament of the United Kingdom

Factories Act 1937 (Note: Section 160.)
- Act of Parliament
- Parliament of the United Kingdom
- Long title: An Act to consolidate, with amendments, the Factory and Workshop Acts, 1901 to 1929, and other enactments relating to factories; and for purposes connected with the purposes aforesaid.
- Citation: 1 Edw. 8 & 1 Geo. 6. c. 67
- Introduced by: Sir John Simon (Commons)
- Territorial extent: England and Wales; Scotland; (Note: Section 160.)

Dates
- Royal assent: 30 July 1937
- Commencement: 1 July 1938 (Note: Section 160.)
- Repealed: 1 April 1962
Other legislation
Amends	See § Repealed enactments
Repeals/revokes	See § Repealed enactments
Amended by	Food and Drugs Act 1938; Factories Act 1948; Justices of the Peace Act 1949; Customs and Excise Act 1952; Mines and Quarries Act 1954; Food and Drugs (Scotland) Act 1956; Factories Act 1959
Repealed by	Factories Act 1961

Status: Repealed

Text of statute as originally enacted

The Factories Act 1937 (1 Edw. 8 & 1 Geo. 6. c. 67) was an act of the Parliament of the United Kingdom that consolidated, with amendments, the Factory and Workshop Acts, 1901 to 1929, and other enactments relating to factories in Great Britain. The act was introduced to the House of Commons by the Home Secretary, Sir John Simon, on 29 January 1937 and given royal assent on 30 July.

== Provisions ==
=== Repealed enactments ===
Section 159(1) of the act repealed 14 enactments, listed in the fourth schedule to the act.

Citation	Short title	Extent of repeal
57 & 58 Vict. c. 28	Notice of Accidents Act 1894	In paragraph one of the schedule the words "use, working," the words "canal, bridge, tunnel," and the words "or other work authorised by any local or personal Act of Parliament".
57 & 58 Vict. c. 42	Quarries Act 1894	In section one, the words "any part of which is more than twenty feet deep"; and section three.
1 Edw. 7. c. 22	Factory and Workshop Act 1901	The whole act.
6 Edw. 7. c. 49	Census of Production Act 1906	Section ten.
6 Edw. 7. c. 53	Notice of Accidents Act 1906	Section four and section five so far as it relates to factories and workshops.
7 Edw. 7. c. 39	Factory and Workshop Act 1907	The whole act.
8 Edw. 7. c. 42	White Phosphorus Matches Prohibition Act 1908	The whole act.
6 & 7 Geo. 5. c. 31	Police, Factories, &c. (Miscellaneous Provisions) Act 1916	Sections seven, eight and nine.
10 & 11 Geo. 5. c. 62	Women and Young Persons (Employment in Lead Processes) Act 1920	The whole act.
13 & 14 Geo. 5. c. 42	Workmen's Compensation Act 1923	Subsection (1) of section twenty-eight and section twenty-nine.
19 & 20 Geo. 5. c. 16	Factory and Workshop (Cotton Cloth Factories) Act 1929	The whole act.
26 Geo. 5 & 1 Edw. 8. c. 22	Hours of Employment (Conventions) Act 1936	In section two the words "Sections twenty-three to thirty-five of the Factory and Workshop Act, 1901, and" and the words "factories, workshops and".
26 Geo. 5 & 1 Edw. 8. c. 49	Public Health Act 1936	In subsection (3) of section forty-four the words "to which section nine of the Factory and Workshop Act, 1901, applies," in subsection (4) of section forty-five the words "to which section nine of the Factory and Workshop Act, 1901, applies," in subsection (1) of section forty-six the words "factory, workshop, or" and subsection (5) of that section; in paragraph (e) of subsection (1) of section ninety-two the words "factory (not being a factory to which section one of the Factory and Workshop Act, 1901, applies), workshop, or" and subsection (4) of that section.
26 Geo. 5 & 1 Edw. 8. c. 50	Public Health (London) Act 1936	Sections one hundred and thirty and one hundred and thirty-one.

== Subsequent developments ==
The whole act was repealed by section 183(2) of, and the Seventh Schedule to, the Factories Act 1961 (9 & 10 Eliz. 2. c. 34), which came into force on 1 April 1962.
