= Building Regulations Advisory Committee =

The Building Regulations Advisory Committee (BRAC) was an advisory non-departmental public body of the government of the United Kingdom.

The Building Regulations Advisory Committee was a statutory advisory body that the Secretary of State consulted on proposals to make or change building regulations. In addition the Committee provided expert advice to the Secretary of State on building regulations or related matters. This includes for example the health and safety, welfare and convenience of people in and around buildings; energy conservation and the sustainability of buildings.

It was officially replaced by the Building Advisory Committee (BAC) and the new Industry Competence Committee (ICC) and both help the Building Safety Regulator to meet its duty to keep the safety and standards of all buildings.

== Composition ==
BRAC membership consisted of independent volunteers appointed due to their experience and expertise across the construction sector. Members were appointed for a 3-year term and can serve for a maximum of 3 terms.

== Sub-committees ==
The Building Control Performance Standards Advisory Group (BCPSAG) advised BRAC for England and BRAC for Wales on the performance of building control bodies.

The Competent Person Forum advised BRAC for England and BRAC for Wales on matters of interest for Competent Person Schemes who undertake self-certified building work in England and Wales.

== Abolition ==
BRAC was abolished by the Building Safety Act 2022, which created the Building Safety Regulator to advise the government on the safety and standard of all buildings.
