= David William Baker =

British businessman (born 1959)

David William Baker OBE
- Born: October 30, 1959 (age 66); Fleetwood, Lancashire
- Education: Polytechnic of Central London
- Occupation: CEO of Robust Details Limited

David William Baker OBE is CEO of Robust Details Limited and former Technical Director of the Home Builders Federation (HBF).

== Background ==
Baker was born in Fleetwood, Lancashire. He studied Building at the Polytechnic of Central London, graduating with First Class Honours in 1983.

== Career ==
He worked initially as a building control officer in local government, before joining HBF in 1999. Baker was a founder member of Robust Details Limited and has been CEO since the formation of the company was announced by Ministerial Statement in 2004.

He was awarded an honorary doctorate from Edinburgh Napier University in 2011. In recognition of his work in connection with improving the sound insulation performance of new homes, Dave Baker was awarded an OBE in the 2013 New Year Honours for services to the Construction Industry.

== Personal life ==
Resident in East Sheen, London SW14, Baker is married to Rachel Done. He has three grown-up children.
