= United Kingdom cladding crisis =

Building material flammability issue

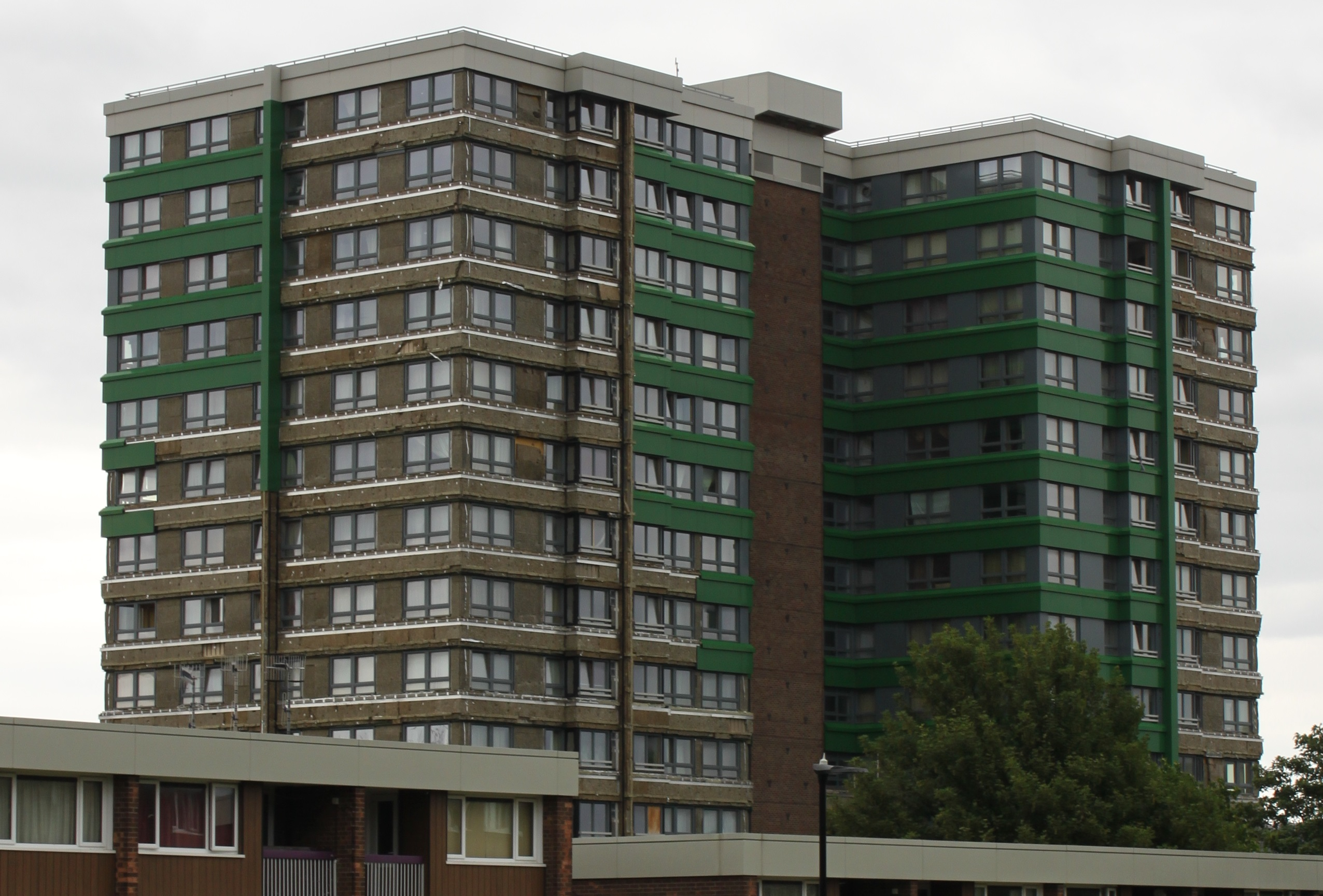
- Hanover House, a residential tower block in Sheffield, with its cladding partially removed after failing fire safety tests following the Grenfell fire
- Date: June 14, 2017 – present
- Also known as: Cladding Scandal
- Type: Crisis
- Cause: Grenfell Tower fire
- Outcome: Renovating cladding

The cladding crisis or cladding scandal is an ongoing social crisis in the United Kingdom that followed the Grenfell Tower fire of 14 June 2017 and the Bolton Cube fire of 15 November 2019. The fires revealed that large numbers of buildings had been clad in dangerously combustible materials, comprising a combination of flammable cladding (the outer covering) and/or flammable insulation.

The term "cladding" here refers to both the external covering and the insulation behind it.

Additionally, many buildings have been found to be non-compliant with other fire-safety building requirements, such as missing cavity barriers around windows and a lack of fire barriers, which are intended to prevent fires from spreading horizontally and vertically into neighbouring flats.

As well as these buildings posing an immediate fire risk to residents, flat owners find themselves facing extensive and costly remedial work, rocketing buildings insurance premiums, inability to sell their properties for more than 7 years, and the possibility of 'waking watches': paying people to patrol buildings 24/7 to check for fires.

Mortgage lenders, struggling to quantify the fire-risks posed by different buildings, have ceased to lend money for the purchase of many properties unless their owners can prove the building is safe, usually by way of an 'EWS1' form.

As of February 2021, the UK government had pledged over £5 billion towards remediation works, but extensive costs were still falling on the shoulders of individual leaseholders of flats who had unwittingly purchased unlawfully constructed homes.

== Background ==
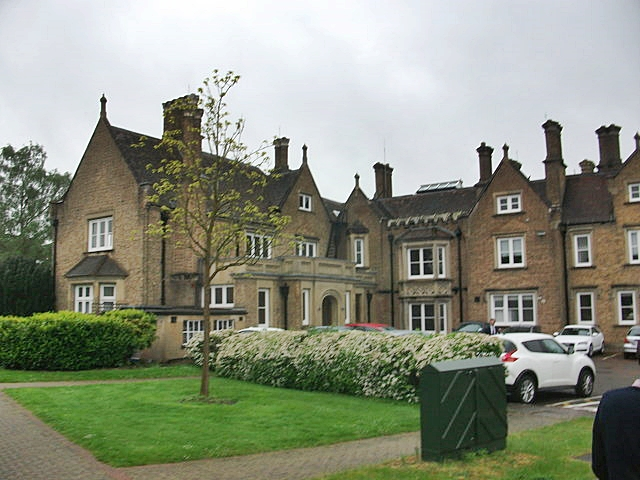
Building Research Establishment, whose privatisation facilitated the safety-certification of unsafe materials

In the 1980s, the Conservative Government introduced its Deregulation Initiative; in consequence, the Building Act 1984 reduced building regulations from 306 pages to 24.

In the same period, the government introduced compulsory competitive tendering, requiring local government to compete with the private sector in delivering services. Accordingly, in 1985, the National House Building Council became the first non-public sector body to be allowed to compete with local authorities for checking that building work complied with regulations. The Conservative government fully liberalised building control in 1997. Compulsory competitive tendering was sustained (and adapted) under the subsequent Labour government through the Local Government Act 1999 and its Best Value policy.

On 19 March 1997, the Building Research Establishment was also privatised, meaning that the safety testing of building materials was no longer conducted by the public sector, but by a charitable trust, increasingly by the manufacturers of building materials themselves.

From the 1990s, the ability to certify building work as following regulations was increasingly passed from independent bodies to the builders themselves. The Building Regulations Act 1991 enabled gas-heating appliance installers to self-certify that their work was safe and legal, and in 2002–2010 Competent Person Schemes were implemented to enable builders to self-certify that their work met regulations in eighteen different fields. By 2019, an estimated 85% of all building work requiring the notification of building control bodies was self-certified, and therefore no longer subject to external inspection.

The Housing Act 2004 introduced the Housing Health and Safety Rating System, enabling flexible 'risk-assessment'-based safety standards for rental properties. This was followed by the Regulatory Reform (Fire Safety) Order 2005. Prior to the Order, all public and commercial buildings, and all non-single-household domestic dwellings (apart from houses in multiple occupation), were required to hold a valid fire safety certificate issued annually after an inspection by the public-sector Fire Service. This regime was replaced with assessment by third-party fire-risk assessors contracted by building owners and landlords, with no mandated timeframe for checks, and no mandated professional qualifications. In 2013, the Fire Service found that 14% of risk assessments were non-compliant with the law, and in 2018 it was found that 500 out of 800 of the UK's fire risk assessors were not registered with accredited bodies.

In 2006, changes to UK building regulations, intended to facilitate greater energy efficiency at lower cost, arguably made combustible cladding and insulation in buildings over 18 m legal, and opened the way to its widespread use.

== Extent of problems ==
Shortly after the Grenfell fire, the Ministry of Housing, Communities and Local Government (MHCLG) established the Building Safety Programme. In the short term, this scheme sought to identify and remediate buildings with unsafe cladding. The problems that it variously exposed, compounded, and remedied constitute the cladding crisis. The programme is, longer-term, leading to a new regulatory framework for building safety, a Building Safety Bill, and a new Building Safety Regulator. In June 2020, the Housing, Communities and Local Government Select Committee estimated that thoroughly remediating fire safety defects in UK buildings over 18 metres alone might cost around £15 billion.

=== ACM cladding ===
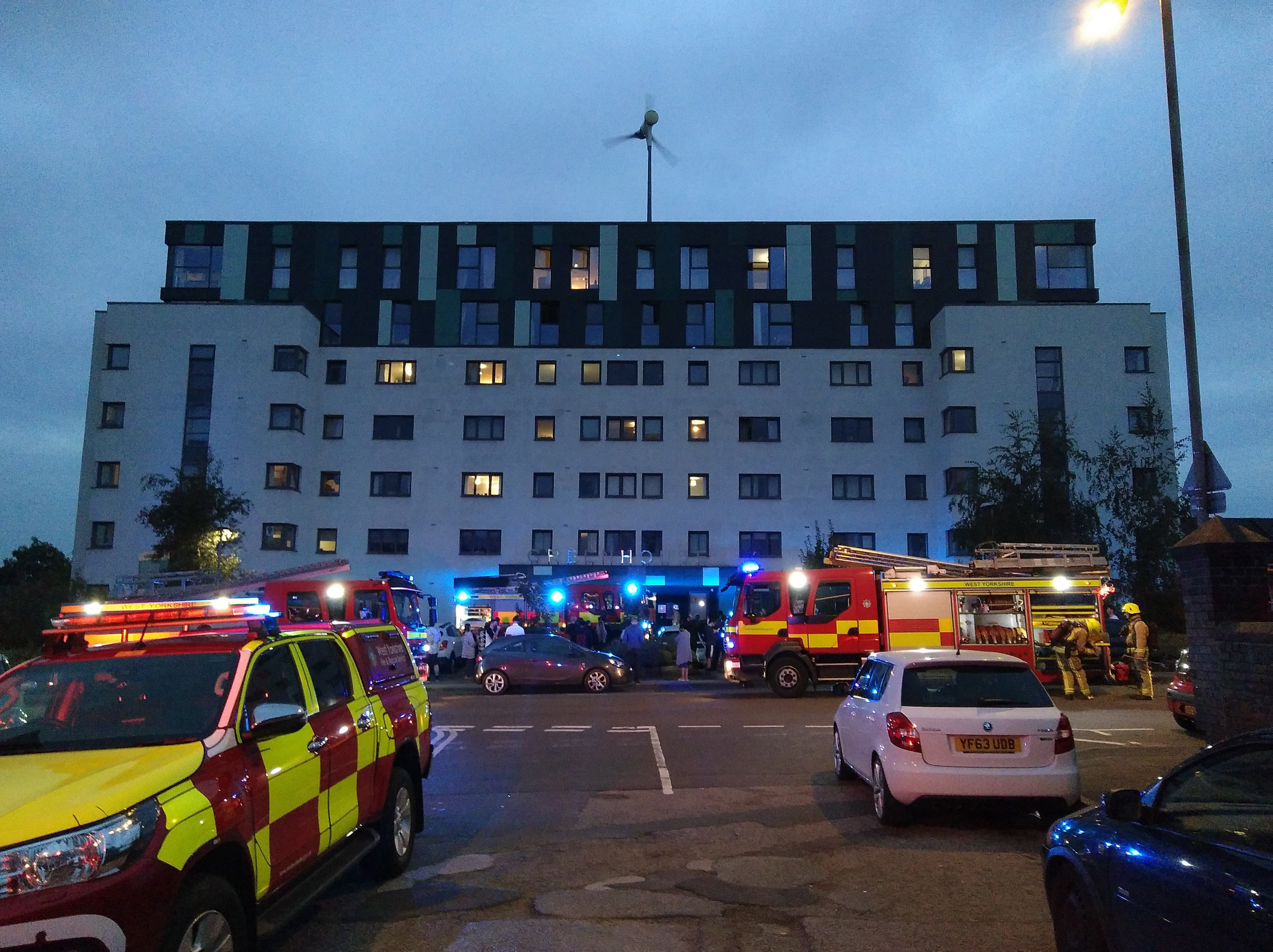
The West Yorkshire Fire and Rescue Service attends a false alarm at Greenhouse (Leeds), a building with a waking watch from August 2020 to February 2021.

The type of cladding that first drew attention was the specific kind used on Grenfell Tower, aluminium composite material (ACM) cladding.

Scottish building regulations and planning law had prevented the extensive use of ACM cladding. While Welsh and Northern Irish law was similar to English, Wales had relatively few examples of ACM-clad high-rises, and by December 2018 had arranged remediation of them all, at the expense of the developers or building owners rather than leaseholders. Northern Ireland had none, though some remediation measures were still necessary.

In England, however, the Government had by 30 November 2019 identified 446 residential and publicly owned buildings over 18 metres in height 'with ACM cladding systems unlikely to meet Building Regulations' of the kind used on Grenfell Tower. At that time, 127 had completed remediation works, mostly social-sector and student accommodation blocks. It was estimated at that time that the remaining buildings comprised up to 23,600 flats and were inhabited by around 56,000 people. As of January 2021, the Government had identified 461 residential and publicly owned buildings in the same category; by that time, 329 had at least removed the cladding, including 231 that had completed remediation works, mostly social-sector and student accommodation blocks.

Although reporting focused on residential buildings, other types were also affected, such as the 52-bed trauma unit at the John Radcliffe Hospital, Oxford, which closed temporarily due to concerns over flammable cladding on the building and other "serious and embedded" fire safety issues. It was also immediately apparent that some buildings had fire-safety issues other than cladding. For example, in August 2017, four 13-storey tower blocks built in 1968 to 1970, containing 242 flats, on the Ledbury estate in Peckham had their gas supplies cut off as a precaution: in the event of a gas explosion, they could be at risk of collapse, since they used the same "large panel system" as Ronan Point that had partly collapsed in May 1968 after a small gas explosion in a flat knocked out a load-bearing exterior wall.

=== Wider problems ===
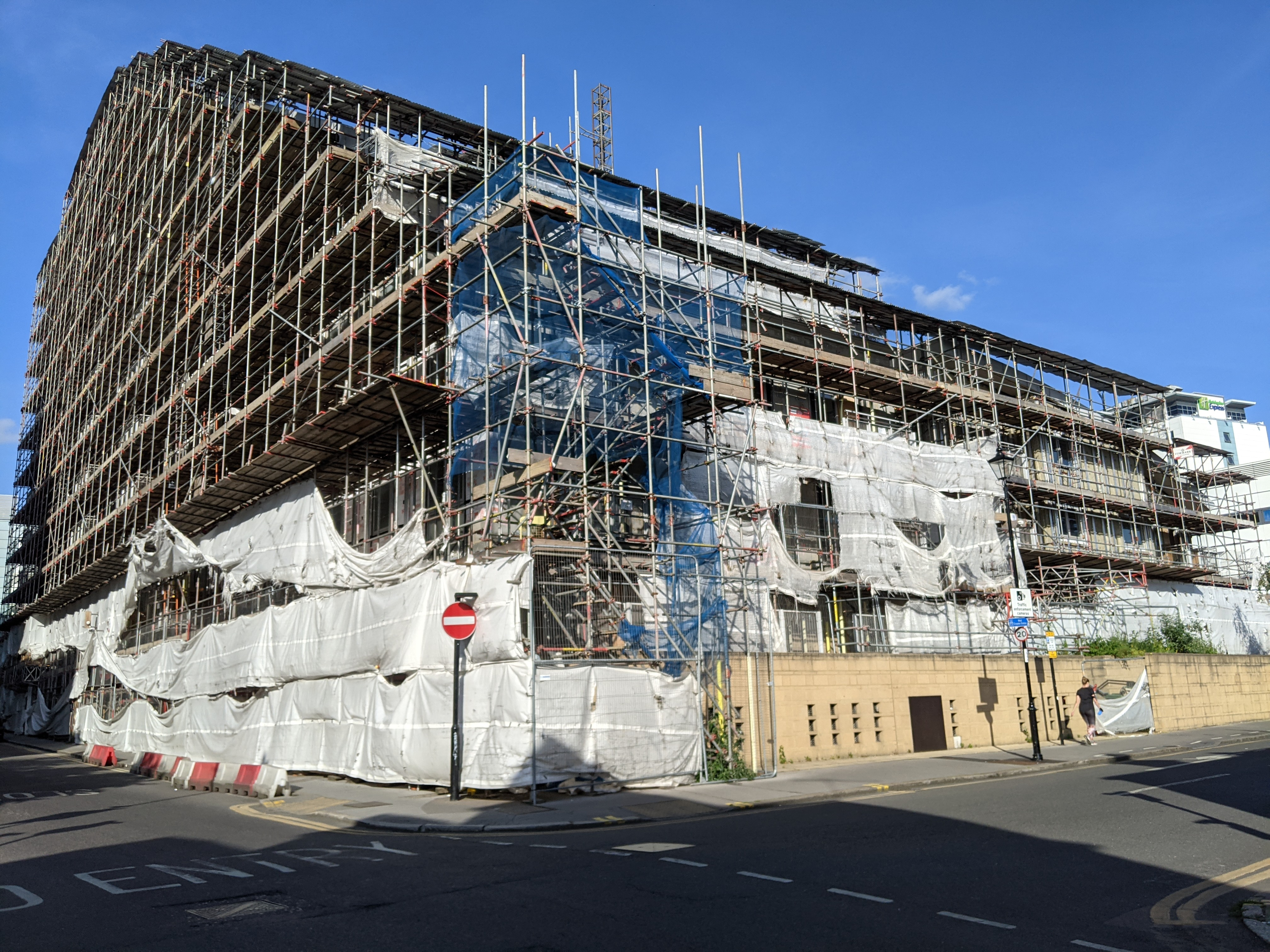
During the removal of flammable cladding from Citiscape, defects were found in the reinforced concrete frame. A review by its developer, Barratt, found similar problems in seven other buildings.

Investigations in the wake of the Grenfell Tower inferno, the Barking Riverside fire in June 2019, and the Bolton Cube fire in November 2019 (which enveloped a building under 18 metres tall, which used combustible materials other than ACM cladding) led to the realisation that far more UK buildings than the ACM-clad ones were not fire-safe, partly due to materials being marketed as meeting regulations which in fact did not, and partly due to builders' failures to comply with regulations in design and construction. Problems included the combustibility of other cladding materials such as high-pressure laminate, combustible balconies, lack of firebreaks in the cavities between walls and insulation, non-regulation-compliant firedoors, and a wide range of other problems. This included some buildings that had already had their ACM cladding replaced with alternatives which themselves turned out to be unsafe.

In June 2020, the UK government offered what the trade magazine Inside Housing characterised as 'a very loose estimate of 1,700 buildings' in England alone which were over 18 metres and high-risk, requiring urgent remediation, despite the ACM-remediation works that had taken place up to that time. The Parliamentary Housing Committee noted that a further 9,600 buildings were likely to have combustible cladding. Inside Housing estimated that this implied 377,600 people living in high rises with dangerous cladding. However, the magazine estimated that the problem in England was greater than this, suggesting 274,000 high-rise flats house up to 657,000 people were affected. Buildings elsewhere in the UK were also affected; for example, on 20 September 2017, it was revealed that combustible cladding had been identified on 57 buildings across Glasgow.

The magazine reported that the scale of the problem regarding the c. 100,000 medium-rise buildings between 11 and 18 metres was as yet unknown. In July 2023, the UK government launched the Cladding Safety Scheme with £5.1 billion allocated and now covering all buildings over 11 metres in height. The scheme has drawn criticism for failing to address those living in buildings under 11 meters.

== Short-term responses ==
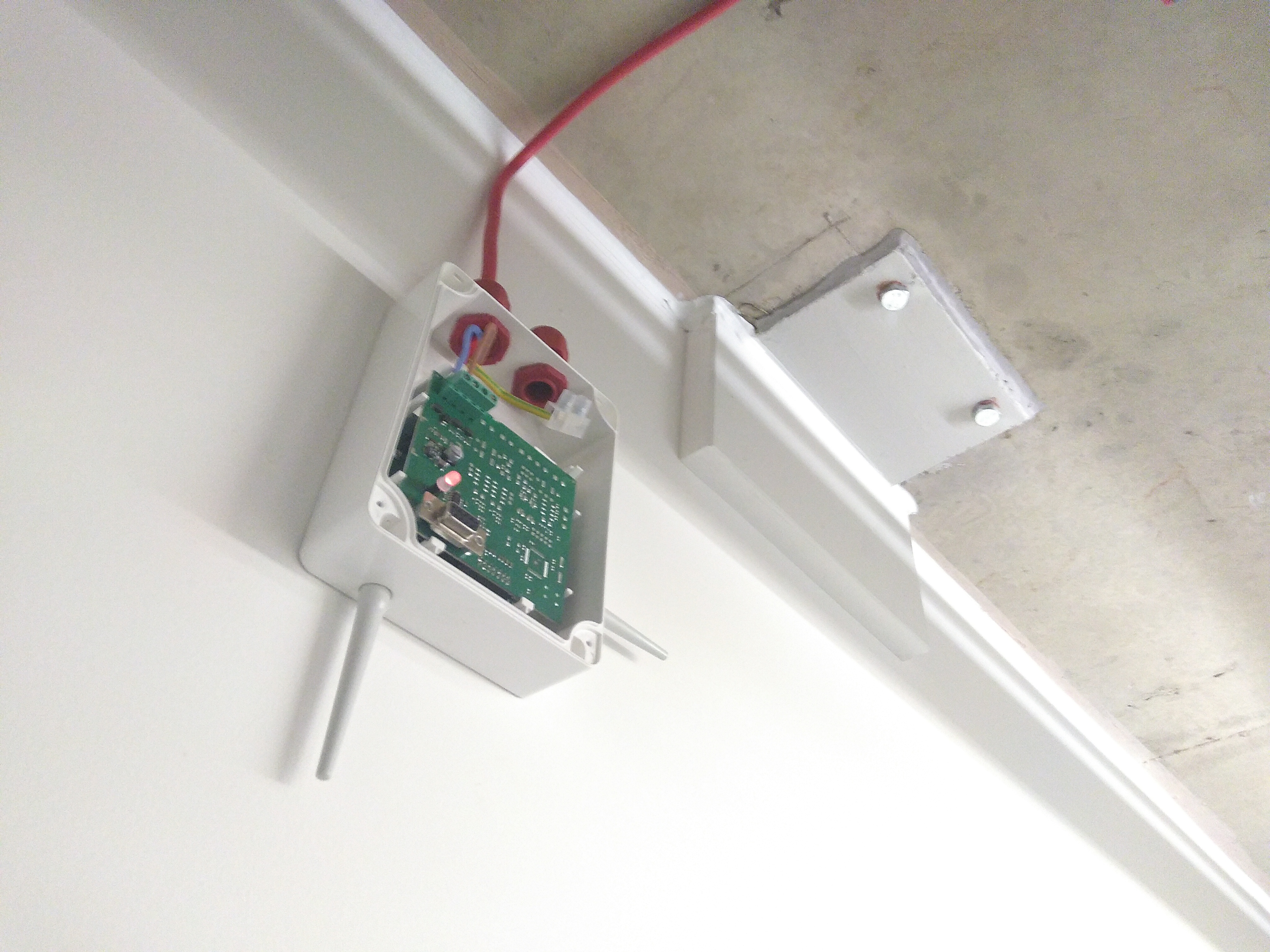
Wireless fire alarm transmitter being retroactively installed in a high-rise block to enable evacuation without a waking watch.

A key short-term response to identifying unsafe construction in tall buildings was to change the fire evacuation policy. Most had been designed to contain a fire within a single flat, such that in the event of a fire, only the inhabitants of the relevant flat should evacuate. The Grenfell Fire showed how disastrous this policy could be in buildings which did not meet safety requirements. Evacuation policies were widely changed such that all inhabitants should evacuate in the event of a fire. A key problem with this change was that buildings' alarm systems were not designed to alert all residents to a fire and facilitate total evacuation. Until such alarm systems could be installed, buildings required a 24-hour 'waking watch' by fire wardens who patrolled the building checking for fire. In January 2021, the Ministry of Housing, Communities & Local Government found the median waking watch cost in England to be £11,361 per affected building per month, or £137 per dwelling.

== Confidence among mortgage lenders and insurers ==
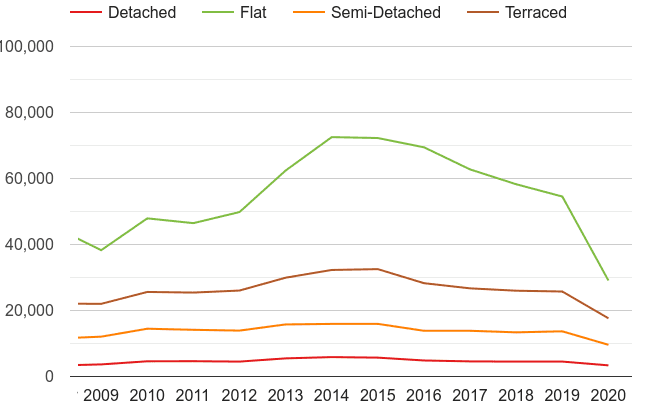
London sales volume by property type 2009–2020, showing a particularly precipitous decline in sales of flats in 2019.

As the realisation grew, during 2019, that large numbers of buildings, of all heights, were likely to be subject to unknown fire-risks and remediation costs, mortgage-lenders concluded that they could not reliably lend money for the purchase of such properties. This led to collapse in sales of a significant proportion of the UK housing stock in late 2019 which as of February 2021 was unresolved. Since flats are often the first step on the UK housing ladder, this had consequences for the whole housing market; for example, the majority of first-time buyers who had bought property using the UK government's help to buy scheme found themselves unable to sell their properties.

In December 2019, UK Finance, the Building Societies Association, and the Royal Institution of Chartered Surveyors introduced the requirement for an External Wall Fire Review (EWS1) of blocks 18 metres or taller to assess whether a property contained potentially dangerous materials. The next month, the UK government issued guidance that all buildings with an external wall system should be assessed for safety. A successful EWS1 test was intended to enable sales, but the vast number of properties for which lenders were seeking EWS1 forms and the lack of professionals qualified to undertake the assessments entrenched the collapse in sales both of risky buildings and of buildings which, while not risky, nonetheless lacked an EWS1 report. The number of properties needing an EWS1 form was roughly halved in November 2020 by a Government agreement with the relevant bodies that requirements for an EWS1 could be made less stringent.

In January 2023, following new guidance by the Royal Institution of Chartered Surveyors, six major UK banks began lending on medium and high-rise flats affected by cladding. However, many individuals have reported continued difficulties in having mortgages accepted, with few sales successfully completing without cash buyers or significantly reduced valuations.

Buildings insurance premiums also began to rise as insurers sought to cover their liabilities. A Financial Conduct Authority report ascertained insurance premiums on multi-occupancy buildings with flammable cladding increased 187% from £26,300 in 2016 to £75,600 in 2021.

== Liability for remediation ==
Most properties affected by the cladding crisis were owned by leaseholders, who in English law lease their property from the freeholder of the building, the party which owns the ground on which the building stands and is by default responsible for the building's upkeep and safety. Most leaseholders were subject to leases that made them rather than freeholders responsible for paying for remedial works. In some cases builders or other parties which had broken the law in building non-regulatory-compliant buildings had gone out of business, and there was general pessimism as to the possibility of recovering costs from builders, including on the part of the National Audit Office and the Ministry of Housing, Communities and Local Government.

In March 2019, it emerged that central government provisions for local councils to take charge of privately owned buildings to ensure safe cladding were failing in approximately 90% of cases, leaving tens of thousands of households stuck in buildings with unsafe cladding.

=== Effects on leaseholders ===
Progress on remediating ACM cladding problems was slow, especially in the private sector. A survey performed by the UK Cladding Action Group (UKCAG) found that many of these residents still faced high bills to replace the cladding due to government funds being withheld; in some cases residents were paying for waking watches; and residents' mental health in many cases had suffered.

In July 2020, the government estimated that the average cost to leaseholders to implement remediation in unsafe buildings over 18 metres tall would be £9,000. By contrast, a survey of 1,342 leaseholders by Inside Housing in February 2021 found that around 90% of respondents expected to pay over £10,000, with 62.5% facing a total bill of above £30,000. December 2020 saw the first case of a leaseholder being bankrupted by costs associated with the crisis, and according to Inside Housing's survey, 17.2% were exploring bankruptcy options.

A report on the impact on leaseholders' mental health by the Cladding Action Group found that '9/10 said their mental health had deteriorated as a direct result of the situation in their building'.

=== Campaigning ===
Leaseholders organised to lobby the Westminster government to remedy the situation. In February 2020, a survey by the Leasehold Knowledge Partnership, a charity that supports leaseholders, of leaseholders from 117 housing developments found that 90 per cent of respondents said the government's response to the cladding crisis had been 'no help at all'.

=== Government relief for affected leaseholders ===
In May 2018, the government announced funding of £400m for the replacement of ACM cladding on social housing over 18m tall. The government followed this in May 2019 with £200 million of funding for remediation of ACM cladding on high-rise buildings in the private sector. A year later, it pledged £200m towards making similar replacements on privately owned blocks.

On 26 May 2020 the government announced £1 billion to replace "unsafe non-ACM cladding on residential buildings that are 18 metres and over and do not comply with building regulations".

On 31 January 2021 the government Waking Watch Relief Fund of £30 million opened. This paid for buildings to install alarm systems consistent with evacuating residents in the event of a fire rather than them staying in place (though not for the cost of waking watches themselves).

On 10 February 2021 the Government announced a 'five point plan' and £3.5 billion cladding replacement fund. This would pay to remove 'unsafe cladding' from buildings over 18 metres; provide 'a long-term, low interest, government-backed' loan-scheme for leaseholders in 11–18 metre buildings to pay to replace their cladding (paying back no more than £50 per calendar month); and provided nothing for lower buildings or remediation of other expensive fire-safety problems such as a lack of fire-breaks in the cavity between the walls and the cladding, balconies, waking watches, or non-compliant fire-escape routes.

=== Building Safety Bill and McPartland-Smith Amendments ===
The Building Safety Act was introduced in the House of Commons on 5 July 2021. The McPartland-Smith Amendments are amendments to the bill which were tabled by Conservative rebels Stephen McPartland and Royston Smith. The amendments include zero-VAT rating for all remediation work and waking watch costs, a government-backed insurance scheme, and legislative protection to prevent costs being passed down to leaseholders. Amendment NC4 requires the government to create a fund into which all builders of higher-risk buildings, residential mortgage lenders and residential building insurers must make contributions. No builder will be able to obtain building control approval to construct any building unless it becomes a member of the scheme and pays its dues. Leaseholders and leaseholder representative groups giving evidence to the Public Bill Committees said the Smith-McPartland amendment on a Building Safety Indemnity Scheme (NC4) will help leaseholders.

=== Fox Amendment ===
The Fox Amendment is an amendment to the UK Fire Safety Bill tabled by Liam Fox as a partial resolution to the UK cladding crisis. The amendment, based on the polluter pays principle and part IIA of the Environmental Protection Act 1990, requires builders to pay remediation costs if their buildings were not compliant with building regulations in force at the time of construction.

The Fire Safety Act 2021 received royal assent on 29 April 2021.

== Devolved administrations ==
=== Scotland ===
Building (Scotland) Amendment Regulations 2023
- Statutory Instrument
- Scottish Parliament
- Citation: SSI 2023/177

Dates
- Made: 6 June 2023
- Laid before Parliament: 8 June 2023
- Commencement: 1 April 2024
Other legislation
Made under	Building (Scotland) Act 2003

Text of statute as originally enacted

Minor updates to building safety regulations were presented to the Scottish Parliament in 2023, and passed as the Building (Scotland) Amendment Regulations 2023 (SSI 2023/177).

Housing (Cladding Remediation) (Scotland) Act 2024
- Act of the Scottish Parliament
- Scottish Parliament
- Long title: An Act of the Scottish Parliament to confer on the Scottish Ministers powers to identify external wall cladding systems on residential buildings that create or exacerbate risks to human life and to address those risks; to establish a register to record that a building’s cladding has been assessed and that remediation works have been completed; to enable one or more schemes to be established to require persons in the building industry to contribute towards assessing and remediating dangerous cladding; and for connected purposes.
- Citation: 2024 asp 7

Dates
- Royal assent: 21 June 2024

Text of statute as originally enacted

Text of the Housing (Cladding Remediation) (Scotland) Act 2024 as in force today (including any amendments) within the United Kingdom, from legislation.gov.uk.

In 2024, the Housing (Cladding Remediation) (Scotland) Act 2024 (asp 7) was passed by the Scottish Parliament to remediate those who live in buildings with cladding.

=== Wales ===
Building (Amendment) (Wales) Regulations 2019
- Statutory Instrument
- National Assembly for Wales
- Citation: SI 2019/1499

Dates
- Made: 11 December 2019
- Laid before Parliament: 13 December 2019
- Commencement: 13 January 2020
Other legislation
Made under	Building Act 1984

Text of statute as originally enacted

Building (Amendment) (Wales) Regulations 2022
- Statutory Instrument
- Senedd Cymru
- Citation: SI 2022/564

Dates
- Made: 20 May 2022
- Laid before Parliament: 24 May 2022
- Commencement: 23 November 2022
Other legislation
Made under	Building Act 1984

Text of statute as originally enacted

Text of the Building (Amendment) (Wales) Regulations 2022 as in force today (including any amendments) within the United Kingdom, from legislation.gov.uk.

Updates to building safety regulations were presented to the National Assembly for Wales – the Building (Amendment) (Wales) Regulations 2019 (SI 2019/1499) – and the Senedd – the Building (Amendment) (Wales) Regulations 2022 (SI 2022/564).

=== Northern Ireland ===
A series of recommendations regarding building regulations were described in a report to the Department for Communities.

== See also ==
- Leaky homes crisis
- Leaky condo crisis
- Crumbly concrete crisis
