= Building regulations approval =

Building control in the UK

To comply with the Building Act 1984 and the subsequent statutory instruments known as the Building Regulations, Building regulations approval is required to construct certain structures in England and Wales. Construction projects falling into this category are sometimes referred to as "notifiable", however this is different from the "notification" (which may also be required under the Construction (Design and Management) Regulations 2015, which seeks to monitor health and safety in construction projects.

The rules vary for Scotland and Northern Ireland, but elsewhere Building Regulations approval can usually be obtained by application to a building control body (BCB), of which there are two types: local Authority BCBs (usually a council's building control department) and private BCBs (known as Approved Inspectors). If an Approved Inspector is used, before any controlled building work can start on site they must inform the local authority about the work. This is called giving an 'initial notice'. This notice states that a particular Approved Inspector is the BCB for the specified works, at the specified location.

If using a local authority, approval can be obtained in 1 of 3 ways:-

== 1. Full Plans ==
By the "full plans" method where drawings are deposited with the Local Authority and are subsequently checked for compliance with the Building Regulations.

The various stages of the work are also inspected and checked for compliance with the relevant technical requirements of the Building Regulations; by a Building Control Surveyor employed by the Local Authority.

This is the most thorough option. And a response from the Local Authority will typically take 4–8 weeks. However, unlike planning permission, work may start before approval has been granted. It is also quite usual for the final building to differ in some respects to that which received full plans approval, in which case amended "as built" plans are often required to be submitted to the Local Authority. A "completion certificate" is issued upon completion, as long as the completed work complies with the Building Regulations.

== 2. Building Notice ==
By the "building notice" method where notice of commencement of (minor) building work is given to the Local Authority at least two days prior to commencement of work. The various stages of the work are then inspected and approved by the Local Authority but no plans are checked.

This method may not be used if the premises contain a workplace, or creates new flats.

== 3. Regularisation ==
This is the retrospective approval for work already carried out without consent - and can only be administered by a Local Authority.

Most commonly, it is used by the owner of a building to apply for retrospective approval for illegal building work. The Local Authority will assess, and verify by means of site visits, plans and information submitted, identify non-compliant items, open up and inspect works, monitor the making good of defective work and, if satisfied, issue a Certificate.

An application for a Regularisation Certificate does not prevent the Authority taking legal action for failure to comply with the Building Regulations when the work was first carried out.

Generally Fees are paid to the Building Control Body, with each application. These will vary depending on the size and value of the project, and between different Local authorities across the country, and each Approved Inspector is free to set their own levels of charges. Some types of work may be exempt fees, e.g. adaptations or alterations for Disabled Persons.

Some work such as Electrical and Heating installations can be carried out by persons who can certify work as being Building Regulation compliant, without further inspection by either the Local Authority or an Approved Inspector. Any work certified in this way must however be registered with the Local Authority in the geographical area in which the work has been carried out.

A Building Control Body should issue a "Completion Certificate" or "Final Certificate" upon the practical completion of each building project, to state that the work meets the technical requirements of the Building Regulations.

If an Approved Inspector cannot do this due to omissions and/or known failures of the building work to show compliance with the relevant technical requirements of the Building Regulations, then the relevant local authority should investigate and consider the need to take appropriate enforcement action.

Building Regulation 'Enforcement Action' and/or 'incomplete work status' is normally recorded in the Local Lands Charges Register, held as a 'public record' by the relevant local authority. Solicitors must search these records prior to any purchase of any building.

Compiled with reference to the Building Control pages of Manchester City Council and Woking Borough Council, and with reference to the UK Government's pages at
