= OSSB =

OSSB may refer to:

- Order of the Star Spangled Banner, an oath-bound secret society in New York City
- Oriented structural straw board, an engineered board
- Orquesta Sinfonica Simon Bolivar, a Venezuelan symphony orchestra
- Ohio State School for the Blind
- Oregon State School for the Blind, later Oregon School for the Blind
