= Rus Flight 9633 =

2001 aviation accident in Russia

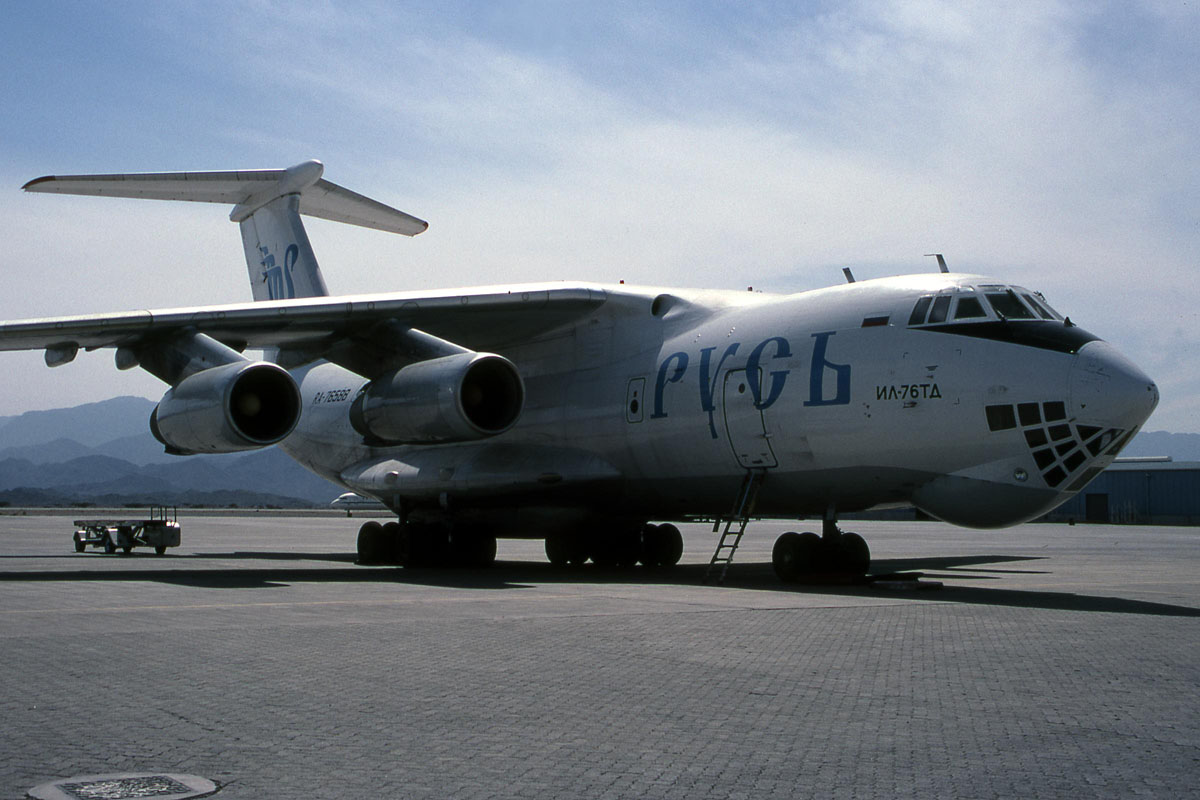
- RA-76588, the aircraft involved in the accident, pictured in March 2001

Accident
- Date: 14 July 2001
- Summary: Crashed after takeoff
- Site: Moscow, Moscow Oblast, 1.5 km from Chkalovsky Airport

Aircraft
- Aircraft type: Ilyushin Il-76TD
- Operator: Rus
- ICAO flight No.: RUR9633
- Registration: RA-76588
- Flight origin: Chkalovsky Airport, Moscow, Russia
- 1st stopover: Alykel Airport, Norilsk, Russia
- Last stopover: Bratsk Airport, Bratsk, Russia
- Destination: Taiyuan Wusu Airport, Taiyuan, China
- Occupants: 10
- Passengers: 2
- Crew: 8
- Fatalities: 10
- Survivors: 0

Rus Flight 9633 was an international cargo flight operated by Rus from Chkalovsky Airport in Moscow Oblast, Russia, to Taiyuan, China, with scheduled intermediate stops at Norilsk and Bratsk. On 14 July 2001, the Ilyushin Il-76TD operating the flight, registered RA-76588, struck trees shortly after take-off from Chkalovsky and subsequently crashed. All eight crew members and two passengers on board were killed.

== Aircraft ==
The aircraft involved was an Ilyushin Il-76TD, registered RA-76588, with construction number 0043451530 and serial number 39-03. It was built in April 1984 by the Tashkent Aviation Production Association and initially served with the Soviet Air Forces as CCCP-76588. Following the dissolution of the Soviet Union, the aircraft passed to the Ukrainian Air Force in 1992.

From October 1994, the aircraft was leased to Russian airline Atruvera. On 15 November 1995, it was transferred to Aviacon Zitotrans, also on lease from the Ukrainian Air Force, and was subsequently placed in storage in November 1999. It entered service with Rus on 17 July 2000 and remained with the airline until the accident on 14 July 2001.

At the time of the accident, the aircraft had accumulated 3,523 flight hours and 1,831 flight cycles.

== Crew ==
The aircraft carried eight crew members and two passengers. The crew consisted of a captain, first officer, navigator, flight engineer, radio operator, two loadmasters and an inspector. The two passengers were aircraft-maintenance specialists. All ten occupants were killed in the accident.

== Accident ==
Flight 9633 was operating from Chkalovsky Airport to Taiyuan, with scheduled intermediate stops at Norilsk and Bratsk. The flight was operated by an Ilyushin Il-76TD registered RA-76588. Investigators subsequently determined that the aircraft's actual take-off weight was approximately 204 tonnes, about 13.6-14 tonnes above the maximum permitted weight, with its centre of gravity at 29.8% of the mean aerodynamic chord. The aircraft's centre of gravity had not been calculated by the load-control dispatcher, and no cargo-loading plan had been prepared.

The aircraft became airborne at 290 km/h, 25 km/h above the speed recommended by the flight manual. At an altitude of approximately 10 metres (33 ft), the captain began a right turn with a bank angle of 7° to correct a deviation to the left of the take-off course. During the turn, at an altitude of approximately 23-24 metres (75-79 ft), the stabiliser was moved from −5.4° to −3.9° in the nose-down direction without a compensating elevator input.

Before the stabiliser was moved, the aircraft had been climbing at approximately 1.7 metres per second (5.6 ft/s). The climb then ceased and the aircraft descended to approximately 20-21 metres (66-69 ft). About one second before impact, the elevator was deflected 11–12° in the nose-up direction, but the aircraft did not recover.

The aircraft struck trees approximately 930 metres (3,050 ft) beyond the end of the runway and 47 metres (154 ft) to the right of the extended runway centreline, at a height of approximately 22 metres (72 ft). The impact damaged the third and fourth engines and parts of the right wing. The aircraft continued for a further 530 metres (1,740 ft) before striking the ground approximately 1,460 metres (4,790 ft) beyond the runway, where it was destroyed. All ten occupants were killed.

== Investigation ==
The Russian Ministry of Transport concluded that the accident occurred when the aircraft struck obstacles during its initial climb after the crew failed to maintain a safe climb trajectory. The investigation attributed the accident to an adverse combination of factors rather than to a single cause.

The investigation identified deficiencies in the procedures for accepting and documenting cargo at Chkalovsky Airport, which did not prevent excess cargo from being loaded. Investigators determined that the aircraft exceeded its maximum permitted take-off weight by approximately 13.6-14 tonnes.

Investigators also found that the captain had repeatedly used the stabiliser to balance the aircraft during take-off at altitudes below those permitted by the Il-76 flight manual. On Flight 9633, this use of the stabiliser caused the aircraft to depart from a safe climb trajectory. The investigation described the practice as a recurring piloting error that had not previously been identified and corrected.

Other contributing factors identified by the investigation were inadequate coordination among the crew during take-off in restricted visibility, including insufficient monitoring of altitude by the first officer and navigator; restricted visibility caused by local fog, which prevented the crew from detecting the obstacles sufficiently early; and the presence of trees in the approach area for the runway's 121° take-off heading, which did not comply with the applicable requirements for civilian aircraft operations.

The investigation also identified numerous deficiencies in flight operations and aircraft airworthiness management at Rus and Atruvera, as well as in flight-support arrangements at Chkalovsky Airport. Following the investigation, Rus's air operator certificate was revoked and Chkalovsky Airport's certificate of conformity was suspended.
