= Building control =

Building control may refer to:

- Building code, a set of standards for the construction of buildings
- Building control body, an organisation enforcing construction standards in England and Wales
- Building automation, automated control of a building through a Building Management System
