= Building regulation =

Building regulations may refer to:

- Building code, a set of rules that specify the minimum acceptable level of safety for constructed objects
- Planning permission, the permission required to develop or modify land and buildings
- Building regulations in the United Kingdom, statutory instruments that seek to ensure that the policies set out in the Building Act 1984
