= Robust Details Limited =

Robust Details Limited (RDL)
- Company type: Assessing standards of sound insulation in new homes
- Industry: House Building
- Founded: 2003
- Headquarters: Milton Keynes, Buckinghamshire, England
- Key people: Dave Baker, OBE Chairman, John Thompson - Chief Executive Directors: Professor Sean Smith, Rex Nevett, John Tebbit
- Number of employees: 13 staff excluding subcontracted inspectors
- Website: www.robustdetails.com

Robust Details Limited (RDL) was formed in December 2003 in response to the housebuilding industry’s request for an alternative to pre-completion sound testing (PCT) as a means of satisfying the sound insulation requirements of the building regulations (in England and Wales).

== History ==
In January 2001, the Building Regulations Minister, Phil Hope MP, announced that the housebuilding industry would be given 12 months to prove that its proposals for providing adequate sound insulation in new homes, known as ‘Robust Standard Details’ (RSDs) could work. The RSD project was sponsored and supported by the Home Builders Federation (HBF), and was managed by Dr Sean Smith of Edinburgh Napier University.

In May 2004 RDL opened for business, publishing details proven to be capable of consistently exceeding the relevant regulatory performance standards, which commenced in July 2004.

In September 2007 Department for Communities and Local Government (DCLG) announced the outcome of the 3-year review of Robust Details concluding that “the scheme has met or exceeded our expectations”.

In May 2009, RDL achieved United Kingdom Accreditation Service (UKAS) accreditation for its Part E scheme.

In November 2009 Edinburgh Napier University received the Queen's Anniversary Prize for its vital role in the establishment of the Robust Details scheme.

By March 2012, RDL had received more than 550,000 registrations under the scheme, with some half a million new homes now completed using RDs to meet the required sound insulation standards. RDL has carried out sound tests on more than 10,000 new properties built under the scheme and has conducted site inspections on a further 10,000 dwellings under construction. 98 per cent of all tests met or exceeded the Building Regulations requirements, with an average performance 7 dB above the regulatory minimum.

In October 2012, the Department of Finance and Personnel, Northern Ireland (DFPNI) approved the use of the Robust Details Scheme in Northern Ireland.

In July 2014 RDL celebrated its 10th anniversary at the House of Lords led by Former Cabinet Minister Lord Tebbit

By September 2016, 50 new Robust Details had been added to the original 14 published in the first edition of the RDL Handbook.

As of June 2018 RDL has carried out 21,000 sound tests and 14,500 dwellings have been inspected. 98 per cent of all tests continue to meet or exceed the Building Regulations requirements, and an average performance of 7 dB above the regulatory minimum has been maintained.

== Robust details in Scotland ==
The robust details sound insulation scheme for homes was launched in Scotland in January 2012 by Derek Mackay, Planning Minister.

== Robust Detail ==
A robust detail (RD) is a separating wall or floor construction which has been assessed and approved by Robust Details Limited.

In order to be approved, each robust detail (RD) must:

- be capable of consistently exceeding the relevant regulatory performance standards.
- be practical to build on site.
- be reasonably tolerant to workmanship.

The scheme has four main elements:

- Assessment and approval of new RDs.
- Publication in the RD Handbook.
- Registration/Certification of each dwelling in which RDs are to be built.
- Performance management of each RD type including sample testing and inspection, statistical analysis, action to improve performance as necessary and feedback to industry and government.

The RD scheme relies on the consistent high performance of individual RDs as used in the field. RDL monitors the performance of built Robust Details by inspecting and testing samples of registered plots. RDL employs specialist acoustic consultants nationwide to undertake this monitoring and reporting.

In order to ensure the robustness and credibility of the overall RD scheme, any detail that consistently continues to underperform is removed from the scheme.
