= Help to Buy =

Financial assistance to buy a house

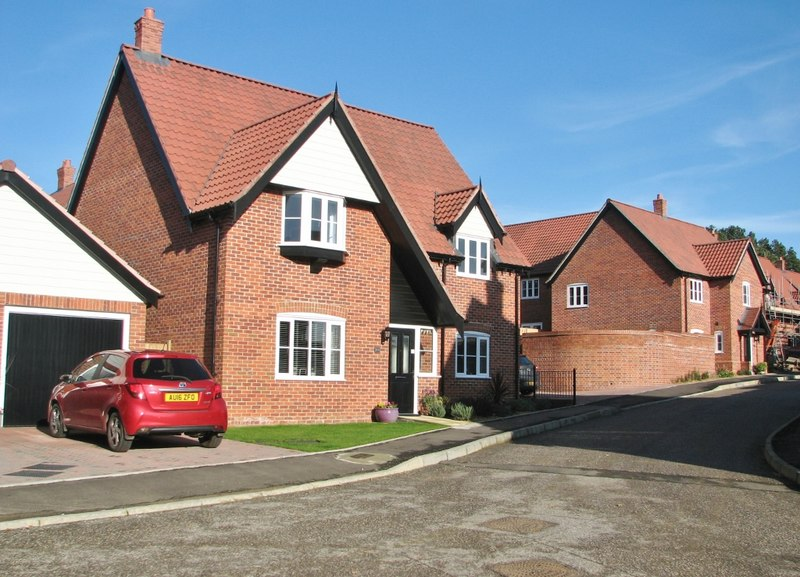
New houses in the UK

Help to Buy is a government programme in the United Kingdom that aimed to help first-time buyers, and those looking to move home, purchase residential property. It was announced in Chancellor of the Exchequer George Osborne's 2013 budget speech, and was described as "the biggest government intervention in the housing market since the Right to Buy scheme" of the 1980s. It is an extension of a previous programme called FirstBuy that was aimed solely at first-time buyers. Help to Buy was itself expanded and extended before being closed to new applications in England and Scotland in October 2022 (a new government scheme supporting first-time buyers - Your First Home - is expected to launch in April 2027).

According to a 2024 study, the programme led to an increase in housing prices without any impact on housing construction in severely supply constrained and unaffordable Greater London.

== Schemes ==
Subject to restrictions, which in some cases vary by country, the types of Help to Buy scheme are:

- Help to Buy: Equity Loans: Buyers contribute a 5% deposit, the government provides an equity loan for up to 20% of the property value (40% within London), and buyers must provide the remaining funds themselves, typically from a mortgage. Available only for new-build under a certain amount (e.g. less than £600,000 in England, £300,000 in Wales); the loan is interest-free for the first five years. This is the most high-profile of the schemes, and is often referred to simply as "Help to Buy". Also known as "phase one" of Help to Buy. Help To Buy was available in Scotland but has stopped accepting new applications as of 5 February 2021. The Help to Buy: Equity Loan scheme was closed to new applicants on 31 October 2022.
- Help to Buy: Mortgage Guarantees: 5% deposit mortgages are available from ten different providers (up from five at the time of its launch), with the government (i.e. taxpayers) acting as a guarantor for the mortgage. Unlike equity loans, this plank of the programme is not restricted to those buying new-build; subject to restrictions, anyone wanting to buy any home in the UK worth less than £600,000 is eligible for the scheme. It is often referred to as "phase two" of Help to Buy. In September 2016, the UK Government announced that the Mortgage Guarantee scheme would not be extended for 2017.
- Shared Ownership: This was already available in the UK via housing associations before the launch of Help to Buy.
- New Buy: Allows buyers to purchase a newly built home with a deposit of only 5% of the purchase price.
- Help to Buy ISA: Under this scheme, savers pay money into an ISA and are then given a cash bonus from the government when purchasing a property. This scheme closes for new entrants in November 2019 and any bonus must be claimed by 2030
- Lifetime ISA: Like the Help to Buy ISA, but this is only open to those aged 18-39. A key difference is that the money saved can be used towards purchasing a home or to fund a pension.

== Oversight ==
Aware of its upward effect upon house prices, George Osborne handed oversight of Help to Buy to Governor of the Bank of England Mark Carney. Carney pledged to bring the scheme to an end if the Bank deemed it to be destabilising the housing market, though it was later confirmed by Carney that the UK's central bank had not, in fact, been granted a veto by the chancellor. As part of the Bank's advisory role, its Financial Policy Committee will produce an annual report.

In January 2014, Carney played down the threat of a housing bubble. It was rumoured at Davos 2014 the same month that Carney had been expressing a wish for the cap of £600,000 for phase two reduced by at least a third, partly to undercut the argument that Help to Buy was a major factor behind soaring prices in London. Regarding the capital, Carney said in February 2014 that price rises, which he said were constrained to the most affluent areas of the city, were beyond his control as governor, since they were driven by the cash purchases of the rich.

== Expansion and extension ==
Phase one of Help to Buy was announced in the 2013 budget and launched on 1 April. Phase two was rolled out in October 2013. In the 2014 budget, phase one, which as originally intended to run till 2017, was extended until 2020, though phase two was not extended.

Help To Buy Equity Loans were further extended for three years (2021 to 2023). Key changes include a tightening of rules so that only first-time buyers are eligible, and a new regional price cap system. The new price caps on the property price range from £186,100 in North East England to £600,000 for London properties.

== Motivation ==
One goal of phase one of the programme was of course to continue helping first-time buyers onto the property ladder by facilitating the purchase of new-build. By doing so, and by also helping existing home-owners to buy new-build, demand for new-build would increase. George Osborne claimed that, by increasing demand for new-build, the supply side of the housing market would be stimulated, i.e. more houses would be built to meet the increased demand for new-build.

== Take up ==
A fifth of the new homes that were built and sold during the first year of phase one were purchased with the help of the first phase. The Financial Times reported there was "clear evidence" that, during the first year of operation, Help to Buy had encouraged lenders to offer higher loan-to-value ratios, with the number of products available at ratios of greater than 90 per cent more than doubling.

== Criticism ==
Help to Buy attracted concern about its artificial inflation of house prices. The International Monetary Fund said the scheme, by pumping up house prices, could actually reduce the affordability of housing for first-time buyers, and called for close monitoring of it. Mark Carney's predecessor at the head of the Bank of England, Mervyn King, expressed disquiet.

The most controversial component of Help to Buy is the mortgage guarantee scheme, described by the chief economist at the Institute of Directors as "very dangerous". Explaining that the UK needed "help to supply, not help to buy", he noted that

Government guarantees will not increase the supply of homes, but they will drive up prices at a time when it seems likely that house prices are already over-valued. When the scheme is withdrawn any rise in prices that has taken place will be undermined, with potentially disastrous results. There is a real risk that the housing market will become dependent on the underwriting by government, making it very difficult politically to shut the scheme down. This should be of great concern. The world must have gone mad for us to now be discussing endless taxpayer guarantees for mortgages. Instead of trying to pump-up prices, the Government should focus on relaxing planning laws and reducing Local Authority charges on developers to make it easier to build more homes.

Doubt on the scheme's vaunted ability to increase house-building was also cast by the Office for Budget Responsibility.

The situation for taxpayers under Help to Buy: mortgage guarantee would be acute if a housing bubble develops, or is already present, while the scheme is in operation, because at some point the bubble has to burst, an event that would lead to an increase in defaults on mortgage repayments. Of course, by the very nature of the scheme, it is when someone stops repaying their mortgage that the UK taxpayer steps in as guarantor. Worse, Help to Buy has been questioned by critics, such as the Royal Institution of Chartered Surveyors, who argue that Help to Buy could itself increase the risk of, and then help to fuel, just such a bubble.

Former Chancellor Nigel Lawson called for the scheme to be restricted and says the scheme should not be available in London's overheated property market.

In Scotland, figures released by freedom of information showed that more than half of the homes purchased with Help to Buy were built by three volume housebuilders, prompting calls from MSPs and housing charities to scrap the 'dysfunctional' scheme. The Scottish scheme has also been criticised for having a "limited impact" in rural areas.

The Scheme has also earned the nickname "Help to Sell Scheme", as the increasing demand seems to benefit existing homeowners, and property developers, rather than the buyer.

Since flats are often the first step on the UK housing ladder, the majority of first-time buyers who had bought property using the UK government's help to buy scheme found themselves unable to sell their properties from 2019 due to the United Kingdom cladding crisis, which saw a collapse in confidence among mortgage lenders in the regulation of fire-safety of tall buildings in the UK.

== UK house prices during Help to Buy ==
In 2013, UK house prices started to take off, with some saying laying the blame at the door of Help to Buy. At the end of November that year, as Mark Carney announced that mortgages and other consumer loans would not be eligible for his Funding for Lending Scheme from the start of 2014, Nouriel Roubini warned of a housing bubble in London.

Since the scheme's introduction, property developer Taylor Wimpey has reported that their average asking price has increased by 22%. This is mainly because the "help to buy equity loan" covers 20% of the property value, and the developer can afford to raise prices due to the increase in a buyer's borrowing potential, as well as the increased demand.

In January 2014, Nigel Wilson, chief executive of Legal & General, called for an end to the programme, saying the government "should stop stoking up demand, there is already lots of demand and this will create a bubble for the future." He said Help to Buy was simply "turbo-charg[ing] an already rising market inside London", where prices had reached "absurd" levels. A few months later, the Royal Institution of Chartered Surveyors urged that Help to Buy be regionalised, so that it would not contribute to what most of its members saw as unsustainable house-price increases in places like London. Duncan Scott of the pressure group Priced Out has stated: "Pumping more money into a housing market with chronic undersupply has one surefire outcome: house prices will go up". As, indeed, they had: April 2014 saw figures published showing UK house prices had risen for 15 consecutive months. In mid-March, UK house prices rose to record highs, though caution is merited, and there were signs that the overheating in some areas was beginning to cool. Mid-April saw the London market, which had seen prices rise by an astonishing 18% in one year, described by commentators as a "superbubble", "a disaster", "out of control".

At the beginning of April, Kris Hopkins, the UK housing minister, said that these house-price increases were a good thing. Business Secretary Vince Cable expressed his disagreement with Hopkins, saying the gathering housing bubble could end up being worse than the one whose collapse resulted in the 2008 financial crisis. At the same time, the house-price gap between London and the rest of the UK was pronounced a new record, and Deutsche Bank and others sounded more alarms about the situation in the capital. George Osborne said he had "not seen any evidence" that Help to Buy was fuelling the boom.

Despite the run up in prices in places such as London, Ian McCafferty, who sits on the Bank of England's Monetary Policy Committee, argued that the housing market had by no means fully recovered, because the number of house sales taking place was still below historic norms, though increasing prices were predicted to at least partly cure the situation.

Other notable factors were cited as contributing to inflating prices, the main ones being: a continuing lack of supply. Record-low borrowing costs; economic recovery; and, particularly in London, demand from foreign investors.

In May 2014, the OECD weighed in on the UK's housing market, again noting the overheating, and called for Osborne to rein in Help to Buy.

== Your First Home (2027) ==
Help to Buy was closed to new applications in England and Scotland in October 2022. A new government scheme supporting first-time buyers - Your First Home - was announced in September 2026, and is expected to launch in April 2027.
