= Fire Safety Certificate =

Russian regulatory document

Fire Safety Certificate is also called as the Certificate of Conformity to the Requirements of Fire Safety which is given to a building structure such as hospitals, educational institutions, government and private offices, factories, and residential apartments after the completion of a Fire Safety Audit. The function of the given certificate is to prove conformity of the production to the approved rules of safety. In Russia the Certificate of Conformity to Requirements of Fire Safety may be received in the case when the production went through the procedure of certification tests after which their owner was provided with the protocol of the tests which serves as the base of issuing the Certificate. For each kind of production there are certain methods of tests and requirements which are described in the Fire Technical Reglament for some kind of goods.

== What kinds of goods need the certificate? ==
Article 143 of the RF Federal Law 123 lists all the goods that need obligatory certification for conformity to fire safety. In spite of this, by his own initiative the customer may draw up the voluntary certificate of conformity to the requirements of fire safety. The whole process of receiving such certificate does not differ from the process of receiving the obligatory certificate.

== The documents ==
During the process of receiving the Fire Safety Certificate, the certification body must obligatory be provided with the packet of the documents which are different for each kind of goods. Certification of fire safety is performed in accordance with the norms of technical rules existing for each kind of production. In spite of this, some documents must be provided in any case, i.e. by certification of fire safety of any kind of goods:

1. Technical conditions for the production;
2. The other technical documents for the goods, i.e. the passport, the drawings, the description of devices or constructions;
3. Statute documents.

== More details ==
After all the necessary documents are provided, the body that performs evaluation of safety of production selects samples for tests. After this, the received results are entered into the act of selection of samples and into the act for performing tests. The results of the performed tests are also entered into the corresponding protocol which serves as the reason for making decision for issuing the certificate. Basing on the decision made, the applicant receives the Certificate of Conformity to Fire Safety or not.

The list of the documents necessary for drawing up the Fire Safety Certificate:

- OGRN;
- The requisites;
- The application;
- The statistics code;
- INT (Identification Number of a Taxpayer);
- The document of property or the contract of lending the premises;
- The first three and the last pages of the Statute of the Enterprise;
- The technical conditions (only in the case when the production is manufactured not according to the GOST);

== See also ==
- GOST standards
