= Swift brick =

Construction component for birds to nest in

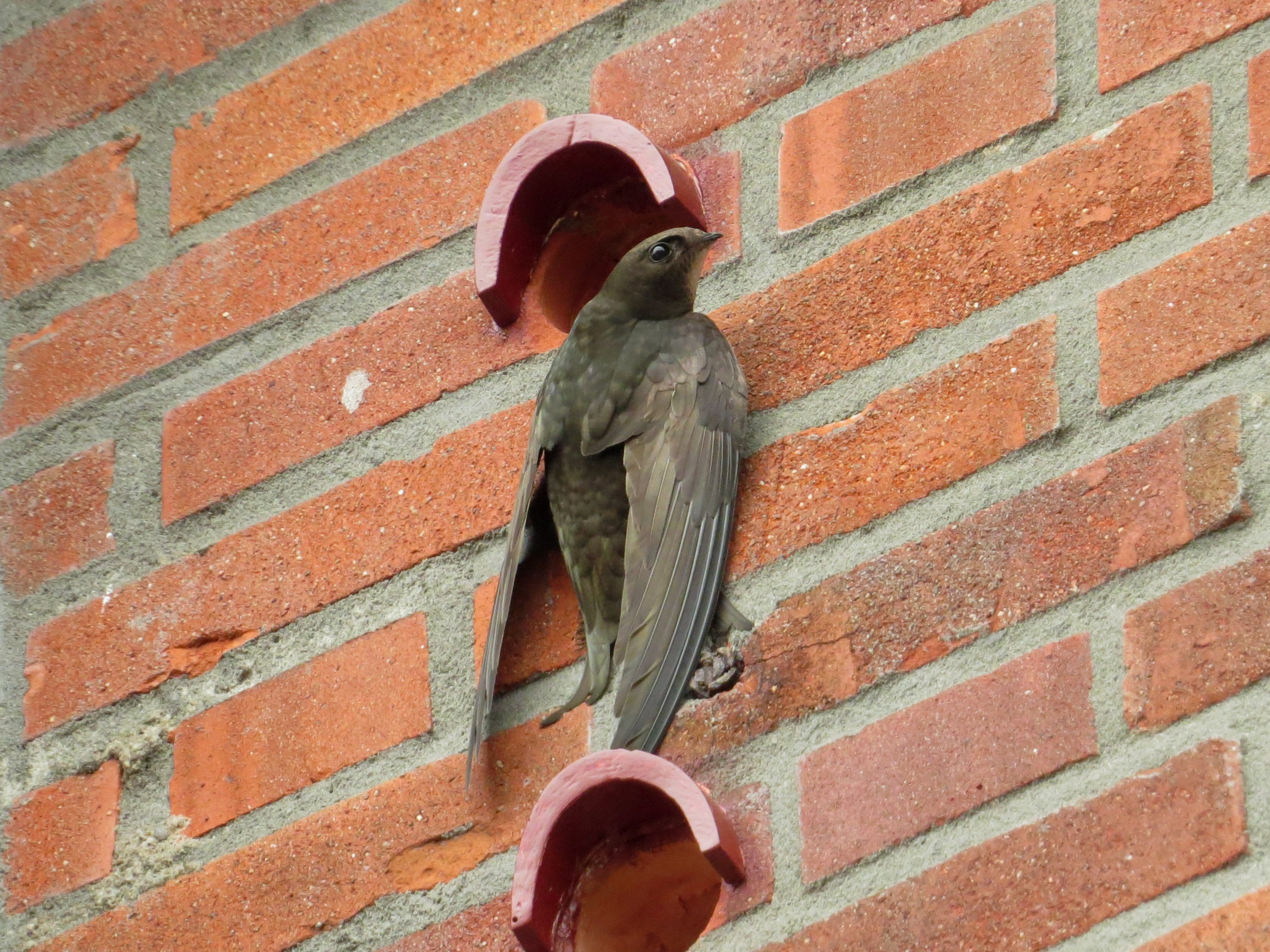
A swift on a wall containing swift bricks, containing internal nest boxes

A swift brick is a hollow construction brick containing a cavity that allows swifts to nest within it, functioning in a manner similar to a nest box. It was developed in response to declining swift populations in the United Kingdom, largely attributed to the loss of natural nesting sites.

== Background ==
Swifts are small migratory birds that predominantly reside in sub-Saharan Africa, but breed in temperate regions during the summer. Historically, the common swift nested in small cavities within cliffs and crags. In response to anthropogenic changes, it has adapted to urban environments, nesting in nooks and cavities on the exterior of buildings.

Since the mid-1970s, populations of swifts in the UK have declined, with an estimated 57% reduction in abundance between 1995 and 2017.

== Design and installation ==
Swift bricks are rectangular, hollow structures with a small aperture through which swifts can enter and exit. They are manufactured from concrete, a combination of brick and concrete, or uPVC with a polypropylene exterior. The bricks are intended for installation high on the exterior of building facades. Their design and installation are guided by British Standard BS 42021:2022.

== Legislation ==
There is an active cross-party parliamentary campaign to make the installation of swift bricks compulsory in new building projects in England.

On 28 January 2026, the Scottish Parliament voted to make swift bricks compulsory in new housing developments where practically and reasonably possible. Section 41 of the Natural Environment (Scotland) Act 2026 directs the Scottish Ministers to amend the building regulations in Scotland to give effect to this provision.
