= Sustainable and Secure Buildings Act 2004 =

Act of the Parliament of the United Kingdom

Sustainable and Secure Buildings Act 2004 (Note: Section 11(1).)
- Act of Parliament
- Parliament of the United Kingdom
- Long title: An Act to make provision in relation to matters connected with buildings.
- Citation: 2004 c. 22
- Territorial extent: England and Wales (Note: Section 11(5).)

Dates
- Royal assent: 16 September 2004
- Commencement: Various (Note: Section 11(3)–(4).)
Other legislation
Amends	Building Act 1984; Education Act 1996; Deregulation (Building) (Initial Notices and Final Certificates) Order 1996; Transport Act 2000 (Consequential Amendments) Order 2001; Education Act 2002

Status: Current legislation

Text of statute as originally enacted

Revised text of statute as amended

The Sustainable and Secure Buildings Act 2004 (c. 22) is an act of the Parliament of the United Kingdom.

Andrew Stunell MP states "The Act creates new powers to make Building Regulations on these topics [that is sustainable eco-friendly buildings, secure against climate and environmental changes], and also requires the Government to report to Parliament every two years on what it has done. The next task is to make quite sure the new Act doesn't just sit on a shelf getting dusty, but that the necessary regulations come forward quickly, and that the first report to Parliament demonstrates real progress being made."

== Legislative passage ==
The legislation was introduced as a private member's bill.

== Purpose ==
The goal of the legislation was to make buildings more fuel-efficient and safer from crime.

== Provisions ==
The act modified existing building regulations, by allowing the UK government to include requirements relating to energy and security.

== Commencement ==
The act came into force in September 2004.

== Reception ==
The legislation was supported by the Construction Products Association.

== Further developments ==
A parliamentary report on the act suggested that the priority should be on making improvements to all buildings.

In 2014, the Welsh Government published its first report under the requirements of the act, with previous reports in relation to Wales being published by the Department for Communities and Local Government.
