= Building regulations in the United Kingdom =

Statutory regulations

Building Safety Act 2022 (Note: Section 171.)
- Act of Parliament
- Parliament of the United Kingdom
- Long title: An Act to make provision about the safety of people in or about buildings and the standard of buildings, to amend the Architects Act 1997, and to amend provision about complaints made to a housing ombudsman.
- Citation: 2022 c. 30
- Introduced by: Michael Gove MP, Secretary of State for Levelling Up, Housing and Communities (Commons); Lord Greenhalgh (Lords)
- Territorial extent: England and Wales; Scotland (in part); Northern Ireland (in part); (Note: Section 169.)

Dates
- Royal assent: 28 April 2022
- Commencement: Various (Note: Section 170.)
Other legislation
Amends	Limitation Act 1980; Architects Act 1997
Amended by	Renters' Rights Act 2025

Status: Amended

Text of statute as originally enacted

Revised text of statute as amended

Building regulations in the United Kingdom are statutory instruments or statutory regulations that seek to ensure that the policies set out in the relevant legislation are carried out. Building regulations approval is required for most building work in the UK.

Building regulations that apply across England and Wales are made under powers set out in the Building Act 1984 (c. 55) while those that apply across Scotland are set out in the Building (Scotland) Act 2003. The Building Act 1984, as amended by the Building Safety Act 2022 (c. 30), permits detailed regulations to be made by the Secretary of State for England and by a Welsh Minister for Wales.

The building regulations made under the Building Act 1984 have been periodically updated, rewritten or consolidated, with the latest and current version being the Building Regulations 2010. The UK Government (at Westminster) is responsible for the relevant legislation and administration in England, but as 'Building Regulations' and 'Building Safety' are devolved areas of law, in the other parts of the UK, the Welsh Government (at Cardiff) is the responsible body in Wales, the Scottish Government (at Edinburgh) is responsible for the issue in Scotland, and the Northern Ireland Executive (at Belfast) has responsibility within its jurisdiction.

There are very similar (and technically very comparable) Building Regulations in the Republic of Ireland. The English Building Regulations 2010 and the Building Act 1984 (in England) have been updated, on 1 October 2023, with major changes by the Building Safety Act 2022 (c. 30).

== Regulatory structure ==
The detailed requirements of the Building Regulations in England and Wales are scheduled within 18 separate headings, each designated by a letter (Part A to Part S), and covering aspects such as workmanship, adequate materials, structure, waterproofing and weatherisation, fire safety and means of escape, sound isolation, ventilation, safe (potable) water, protection from falling, drainage, sanitary facilities, accessibility and facilities for the disabled, measures to limit overheating in new dwellings, electrical safety, security of a building, high-speed broadband infrastructure connections, and the installation of a minimum number of facilities for the charging of electric vehicles in all new buildings (commercial and domestic).

There are entirely separate "Approved Documents" for Wales and England.

In Wales all new dwellings must have automatic fire suppression (sprinklers) installed.

In England only new residential buildings, over 11m high (four floors and more) are required to have automatic fire suppression (sprinklers) systems.

For each Part, detailed specifications are available free online (in the English and Welsh governments' "approved documents") describing the matters to be taken into account. The approved documents are not literally legally binding in how the requirements must be met; rather, they present the expectation of the Secretary of State concerning the minimum appropriate standards required for compliance with the Building Regulations, and the common methods and materials used to achieve these. The use of appropriate British Standards and/or European Standards is also accepted as one way of complying with the Building Regulations requirements.

However, the supply of gas (natural and/or LPG) is not specifically controlled by the Building Regulations, as there are separate Gas Safety Regulations enforced by the Health and Safety Executive (HSE). Fuel storage (e.g. Heating Oil and LPG tanks are controlled, near dwellings.)

Newer versions of Building Regulations are generally not retrospective: they are applied to each new change or modification to a building (or new part of a building) but do not require renovation of existing elements. There are general requirements for any change or improvement, that the building must not be left any less satisfactory in compliance than before the works, and areas worked on must not be left in unsafe condition by reference to current standards. The Regulations may also specify in some cases, that when enough work is done in an area (such as partial new insulation) the remainder of that area must be brought to an appropriate standard; however the standard required for an existing building may be less stringent than that required for a completely new building.

The Regulations also specify that some types of work must be undertaken by an appropriately qualified professional (such as works on gas or certain electrical matters), or must be notified to the relevant local authority's Building regulations approval for certification or approval.

The application of Building Regulations is separate and distinct from 'Town Planning' and 'planning permission'; the Building Regulations control how buildings are to be designed or modified on the public grounds of safety and sustainability while 'planning permission' is concerned with appropriate development, the nature of land usage, and the appearance of neighbourhoods. Therefore, both must be considered when building works are to be undertaken.

== History and timeline of changes ==
=== Building Regulations 2000 ===
Building Regulations 2000
- Statutory Instrument
- Parliament of the United Kingdom
- Citation: SI 2000/2531
- Territorial extent: England and Wales

Dates
- Made: 13 September 2000
- Laid before Parliament: 22 September 2000
- Commencement: 1 January 2001
- Revoked: 1 October 2010
Other legislation
Repeals/revokes	Building Regulations 1991
Made under	Building Act 1984
Revoked by	Building Regulations 2010

Status: Revoked

Text of statute as originally enacted

The Building Regulations 2000 (SI 2000/2531) were regulations imposed on the construction industry in England and Wales by statutory instrument. They were revoked and replaced by The Building Regulations 2010. The regulations were signed by Nick Raynsford, Minister of State, Department of the Environment, Transport and the Regions.

There were several amendments, from 2001-2003:

- The Building (Amendment) Regulations 2001 (SI 2001/3335)
- The Building (Amendment) Regulations 2002 (SI 2002/440)
- The Building (Amendment) (No. 2) Regulations 2002 (SI 2002/2871)
- The Building (Amendment) Regulations 2003 (SI 2003/2692)

From 1 January 2005 the term building work includes work on household electrics.

From 6 April 2006, the Building Regulations are extended by amendments to incorporate some of the European Directives requiring energy in existing and new buildings to be measured, etc. The core term building work was once again amended and extended in scope to include renovation of thermal elements, and energy used by space cooling systems as well as energy used by space heating systems. Both are now subject to efficiency limits, and energy use controls are required. New additional competent persons schemes were proposed and authorised, in respect of energy systems and energy efficient design.

- A total rewrite of Approved Document for Part P (Electrical Safety) was also issued in 2006.
- New Approved Documents for Part F and Part L were issued along with specified 'second tier' guidance documents was also issued in 2006.

=== Climate Change and Sustainable Energy Act 2006 ===
The Climate Change and Sustainable Energy Act 2006 made provision for microgeneration to be brought within the Building Regulations, and increased to two years the time limit for prosecuting contraventions of the regulations relating to energy use, energy conservation or carbon emissions. It also requires the Secretary of State to report on compliance with these aspects of the Building Regulations and steps proposed to increase compliance. However, no such regulations have been laid.

=== Building Regulations 2010 ===
Building Regulations 2010
- Statutory Instrument
- Parliament of the United Kingdom
- Citation: SI 2010/2214

Dates
- Made: 6 September 2010
- Laid before Parliament: 9 September 2010
- Commencement: 1 October 2010
Other legislation
Made under	European Communities Act 1972; Building Act 1984

Text of statute as originally enacted

Text of the Building Regulations 2010 as in force today (including any amendments) within the United Kingdom, from legislation.gov.uk.

A total rewrite of the Building Regulations was issued in the Building Regulations 2010 (SI 2010/2214). However, this has since been amended several times again, in 2011, 2012, 2013, 2014, 2016 and 2018:

- In December 2011, building regulation powers for Wales were devolved, enabling Welsh ministers the power to make building regulations in Wales. Subsequent amendments by both the UK government (regarding the building regulations in England) and the Welsh Government for Wales have caused the building regulations for the two countries to begin to diverge.
- A total rewrite of Approved Document for Part K (Protection against Falling, & Glazing Safety, etc.) was also issued in 2012/2013. This new Part K now incorporated all that once was within Part N (Glazing Safety) and came into force on 1 October 2015.
- 2015 - Part Q ("security") came into force on 1 October 2015.
- 2017 - Part R ("High Speed Broadband Infrastructure") came into force on 1 January 2017. - Revised Part RA "Ultra-fast broadband" for all new Dwellings - December 2022.
- 2022 - Changes to Parts F and L and introduction of a new Part O - mitigation of overheating (in new dwellings) - took effect on 15 June 2022.
- 2022 - introduction of a new Part S - EV (Electric Vehicle) Charging Points - a minimum number is now required for all new buildings (commercial, retail and dwellings) - took effect on 15 June 2022.

=== Building Safety Programme ===
Shortly after the Grenfell Tower fire of 14 June 2017, the Ministry of Housing, Communities and Local Government (MHCLG) established the Building Safety Programme. In the short term, this scheme sought to identify and remediate buildings with unsafe cladding. The problems that it variously exposed, compounded, and remedied constitute the cladding crisis. The programme is, longer-term, leading to a new regulatory framework for building safety, a Building Safety Bill, and a new Building Safety Regulator.

==== Building (Amendment) Regulations 2018 ====
Building (Amendment) Regulations 2018
- Statutory Instrument
- Parliament of the United Kingdom
- Citation: SI 2018/1230

Dates
- Made: 28 November 2018
- Laid before Parliament: 29 November 2018
- Commencement: 21 December 2018
Other legislation
Made under	Building Act 1984

Text of statute as originally enacted

In the Building (Amendment) Regulations 2018 (SI 2018/1230) a number of regulations were amended or created to introduce a restriction on the use of combustible materials within external elevations and specific attachments in certain types of buildings with storeys over 18m - this applied in England only. This change came in the wake of the Grenfell Tower fire. The part of the amendment relating to elements provided to reduce heat gain was subsequently overturned by the UK High Court in November 2019 because "the consultation had been inadequate".

==== Building (Amendments) Regulations 2023 ====
In the Building Regulations etc. (Amendment) (England) Regulations 2023 (SI 2023/911), a number of very major changes, amendments and new statutory provisions were introduced, following the enactment, by (the Westminster) Parliament, of the Building Safety Act 2022 and the Fire Safety Act 2021.

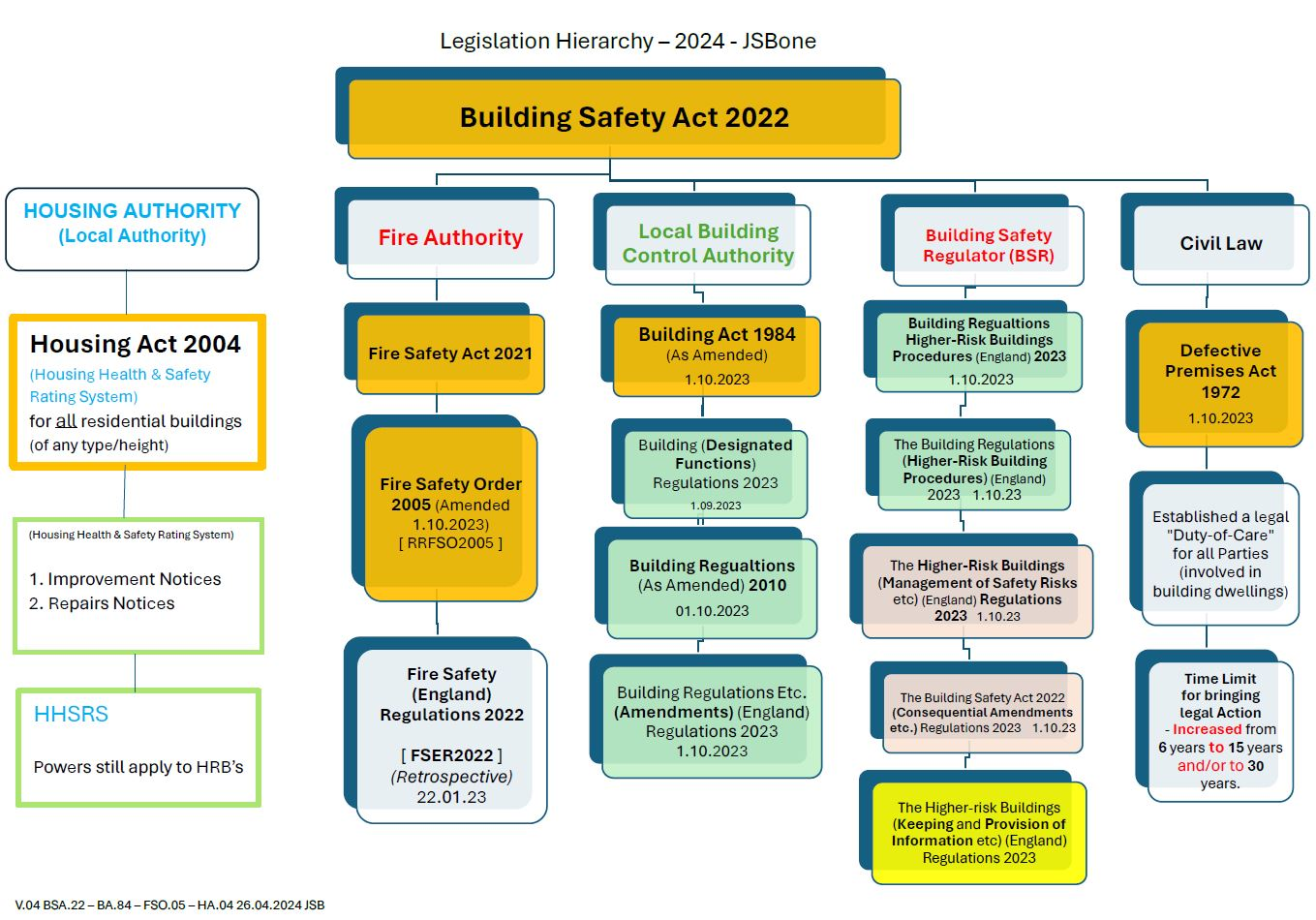

== Approved documents and compliance ==
There are currently eighteen parts (sections) to the building regulations (for England and Wales) and each is lettered as Part A to Part S (however there are no Parts I or N) accompanied by an approved document for that Part X. The approved documents usually take the form of firstly stating the legislation and then providing a number of methods or ways which are deemed to satisfy the regulations.

The building regulations do not aim to stifle innovation, and the introduction of each Approved Document re-states this government aim.

Compliance with the legislation is what is ultimately required and there may be many ways of complying, other than just using the ways set out in the recommended provisions within each of the approved documents. In reality, innovative solutions may be hard to validate, and for much building work the tendency is to follow the guidance of the approved documents literally.

For example, bathroom manufacturers produce a 'Doc M Pack' for disabled toilets, which reproduces exactly the diagram in Part M, and most public disabled toilets are now designed around this layout.

Many manufactured products have agrément certificates issued by the British Board of Agrément (BBA, a construction Products certification service), certifying compliance with relevant standards. However, the BBA and other bodies (TRADA, BRE, Exova Warrington, etc.) may be able to test and certify to "CE" harmonised EU standards. "CE" marking of all construction materials and products is now a legal requirement, since 1 July 2013.

Most of the detailed information on the Building Regulations is now available on http://www.planningportal.gov.uk/buildingregulations/ where general public users can access simplified building regulations guidance, and professional users have access to a reorganised version of what was on the former DCLG building regulations website, including the full versions of the Approved documents and associated guidance, held on the DCLG website (now a constituent part of the gov.uk website).

=== New enhanced building safety regime ===
In England, From 6 April 2024, all work to build a new or alter an existing "higher-risk building" (HRB) – that is a building with seven or more floors, and with more than two dwellings – is subject to the new enhanced building safety regime, which is administered and enforced by the new Building Safety Regulator (BSR) for England. The BSR thus replaces the role of local building control authorities. The private building control sector can no longer supervise work to build a new or alter an existing "higher-risk building".

The former "approved inspectors" (firms) all cease to have any legal function. after 1 October 2024. New "registered building control approvers" (RBCAs) may seek a licence from the BSR.

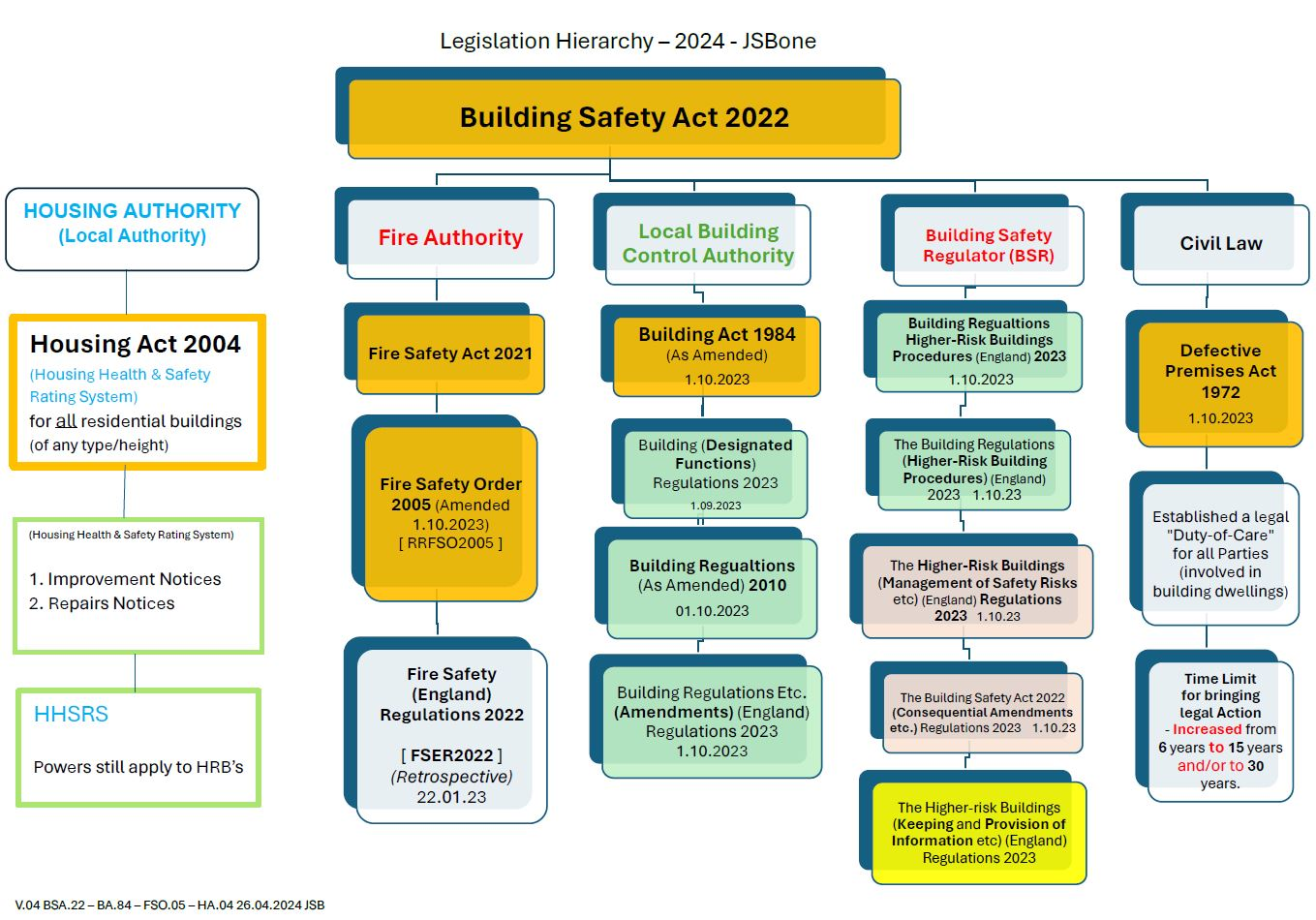

== Approved documents ==
=== Part A. Structure ===
This part requires buildings to be designed, constructed and altered so as to be structurally safe and robust, and also so as not to impair the structural stability of other buildings.

It stipulates design standards that should be adopted for use on all buildings and additionally gives simple design rules for most masonry and timber elements for traditional domestic buildings.

The weight of the building from the walls, furniture and people in the building will be transmitted to the ground, so as not to cause instability to the building or other buildings.

Requires buildings to be built in a way ensuring no collapse will occur disproportionately to its cause.

Ground movement such as freezing of subsoil will not impair the stability of the building.

The Party Wall, etc. Act 1996 also controls walls and foundations being built near to existing buildings. However, it is a civil matter between adjoining land owners and "party wall legislation" is not enforced by the Building Control bodies.

=== Part B. Fire safety ===
The building regulations consider five aspects of fire safety in the construction of buildings:

- Requirement B1 – Means of early warning of fire and adequate means of escape from the building (including emergency lighting and fire exit signage).
- Requirement B2 – Control of Internally fire spread (linings). The wall lining i.e. plaster, plasterboard or wooden boards on the walls and ceiling will resist the spread of flames and give off only reasonable levels of heat, if on fire.
- Requirement B3 – Control of Internal fire spread (structure) will be maintained during a fire, and fire spread will be prevented. Fire and Smoke will be prevented from spreading to concealed spaces in a building's structure by Fire Stopping and Fire Cavity Barriers.
- Requirement B4 – External fire spread – The external walls and roof will resist spread of fire to walls and roofs of other buildings. However, not all buildings are required to have non-combustible exterior finishes.
- Requirement B5 – The building will be accessible for firefighters and their equipment, without delay. Tall and Large buildings to have Fire Lifts and Fire Mains (Dry or Wet riser pipes), and waymarking signage for the fire crews, etc.
- Regulation 7 – Guidance relating to compliance with regulation 7(2) and 7(3) are include with Approved Document B following the 2018 amendments (introducing a ban on the use of combustible materials within external walls, over 18m high) since these regulations are in relation to the specification of the fire performance of external wall construction and specific attachments. Regulation 7(1) continues to be covered by Approved Document 7.

==== Alternative means to comply ====
- Using BS9999:2017 for non-residential buildings
- Using BS9991:2015 for dwellings and other residential buildings

The use of a 'fire engineer' to computer model the building layout and smoke behaviour in such a building.

==== Building Regulation 38 ====
This requires the designer and/or constructor to give the fire safety information (for a description of the information required – see Appendix G of approved document B) to the Responsible Person, upon completion. This is to enable a competent person to carry out a fire risk assessment.

==== Other fire laws (England & Wales and Scotland) ====
Once a building is occupied the Regulatory Reform (Fire Safety) Order 2005 (SI 2005/1541) (Fire Safety Order 2005 - FSO2005) requires a fire risk assessment to be carried out, to take into account how the users are actually using the building (and any fire risks that brings to the building) and the FSO2005 requires the "Responsible Person(s)" for the building to provide and maintain "suitable and sufficient" general fire precautions. Scotland's Fire Safety legislation is very similar and only slightly different in practical effect.

The FSO2005 is criminal law, and breaches of this law can result in the "Responsible Person" being jailed for up to two years and fined up to £10,000 for each offence. Corporate offences may have unlimited fines.

Enforcement is by the local fire authority. It may be necessary to exceed the recommendations of the guidance supporting Part B of Schedule 1 to Building Regulations, in order to achieve a suitable and sufficient level of fire safety required under the FSO2005.

The Fire Safety (England) Regulations 2022 (SI 2022/547) (FSER22) are retrospective and require existing and new residential buildings (with more than two flats) to have minimum fire safety management records and fire safety facilities (a recommendation of phase 1 of 2021 report of the Grenfell Tower Public Inquiry.) The FSER22 are enforced by each county fire authority – they came into legal force on 26 January 2023.

==== Review of fire related building regulations in England, 2017 ====
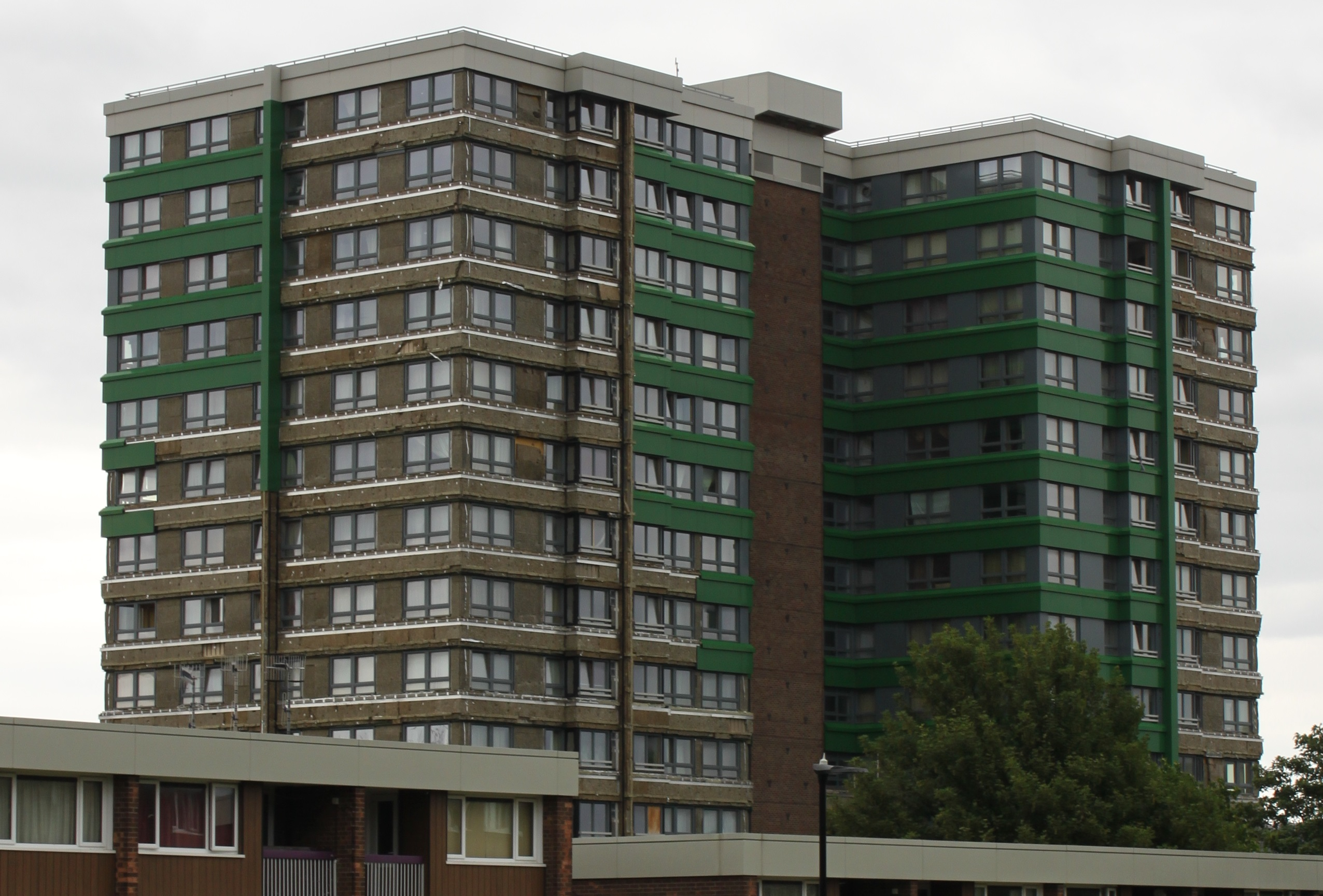
Hanover House, a residential tower block in Sheffield, with its cladding partially removed after failing fire safety tests following the Grenfell Tower fire.

Building regulations are technically under constant review by the DCLG (and are currently being urgently reviewed in light of Grenfell Tower fire). As following this fatal fire in London in June 2017, there is industry wide concern over fire safety issues with many other buildings. Inappropriate combustible material combinations have been found on a broad range of tall local authority, private, NHS, educational and housing association buildings.

Combustible materials within the external construction of the outside of tall buildings must comply with the building regulations but this guidance has sometimes been interpreted as applying only to the insulation and not to the cladding.. There are concerns that fire tests may not accurately reflect real life when a building, cladding and insulation are subject to wear and tear. The DCLG has set up a weekly email newsletter for those interested in this topic.

=== Part C. Site preparation and resistance to contaminants and moisture ===
Nothing should be growing on the ground covered by the building.

Precautions must be taken to stop gases and dangerous substances from previous land use from entering the building and endangering the health and safety of occupants.

Subsoil drainage will be in place, if needed, to stop the passage of ground moisture to the interior of the building and to prevent damage to the fabric of the building.

The walls, floors and roof of the building shall prevent moisture passing to the inside of the building. Damp-proof courses are often used to prevent moisture from the ground rising.

The building must have provision to prevent condensation occurring in the roof structure.

Complaints arose in the Bristol area after Storm Emma in February 2018 that the attics of more than 50 newly built homes had filled up with snow. Barratt Developments and Redrow plc denied any liability, saying that “Lofts in modern homes are designed to act as home ventilators and to eradicate moisture and condensation issues. The vents are installed in order to comply with building regulations and as such the homes affected by the snow were not defective in any way.”

=== Part D. Toxic substances ===
The legal requirement is

D1 If insulating material is inserted into a cavity in a cavity wall, reasonable precautions shall be taken to prevent the subsequent permeation of any toxic fumes from that material into any part of the building occupied by people.

Some insulating materials inserted into (existing) cavity walls can give off toxic fumes. Preventative measures must be taken to stop these fumes reaching occupants of the building. However this requirement is now largely of historical interest as injected materials are now mostly blown chopped fiber and not mixed on-site "chemical reaction" based methods - in the past 2 part mix urea formaldehyde was common, and if ventilation is not correct, and/or the mixing was not well controlled, then this can give off irritating fumes into the building.

See also Part C for controls on toxic hazards from ground contaminants and/or brownfield development.

=== Part E. Resistance to the passage of sound ===
Approved Document E 2003 plus amendments 2004 should be read in conjunction with supplemental document 'Robust Details Part E – Resistance to the passage of sound'.

Separating floors and walls between domestic dwellings are required to meet a minimum sound insulation performance standard. This applies to both new 'purpose built' and converted 'material change of use' properties.

- Purpose-built – the sound insulation value for each individual airborne test should be equal to or greater than 45 dB DnTw+Ctr. Each individual impact test should be equal to or less than 62 dB LnTw.
- Material change of use – the sound insulation value for each individual airborne test should be equal to or greater than 43 dB DnTw+Ctr. Each individual impact test should be equal to or less than 64 dB LnTw.

New internal walls and floors within dwelling-houses, flats and rooms for residential purposes, whether purpose built or formed by material change of use should achieve a minimum performance of Rw 40 dB when tested in a laboratory. Test data is to be taken from a UKAS accredited laboratory.

Pre-completion sound tests have been required since July 2003 to ensure compliance with Approved Document E, unless the Robust Details approach is adopted, see Part L below. Testing is to be undertaken by a UKAS registered test organisation or European equivalent (e.g. ANC). A list of preferred UKAS accredited companies can be found at UKAS Organisation Search. A list of preferred ANC accredited companies can be found at www.association-of-noise-consultants.co.uk.

Care should be taken to ensure site conditions are appropriate before testing commences to ensure tests can be completed and that the best results are achieved.

=== Part F. Ventilation ===
Standards for ventilation and air quality requirements for all buildings are included in this part of the building regulations. Due to the increasing complexity of the Regulations, ventilation strategies and system design must be considered at the earliest stages of building design.

The Building Regulations consider three ventilation types:

- "Whole building" (formerly referred to as "background") ventilation to provide fresh air to dilute and disperse low levels of water vapour and other pollutants, usually by the provision of background ventilators or mechanical supply ventilation.
- "Local extract" (formerly referred to as "extract") ventilation in rooms where most water vapour or concentrated pollutants are released, usually by mechanical means such as extract fans.
- "Purge" (formerly referred to as "rapid") ventilation for the rapid dilution and removal of high concentrations of pollutants from occasional activities, usually by opening windows. The requirements for purge ventilation are set out in Appendix B of Part F1.

The performance rates for each of the "system" approaches set out in Part F are the minimum requirements needed to ensure that adequate air quality is provided for people indoors. The occupants' health could be at risk if these ventilation rates are compromised.

To ensure that these performance rates are met, Part F requires that a flow rate test (also called an airflow test or Part F test) is performed on the installed system and the results submitted to Building Control via a Commissioning Notice.

The performance rates do not take account of summer overheating.

Most systems may be manually or automatically controlled (with manual override).

For each system to be effective, air must be able to flow through the dwelling. The regulations make provision for this via internal door undercuts to maintain a minimum gap of 10mm above the finished floor surface. This provides a 7600mm² permanent opening when a door is closed.

There are alternative methods to achieve compliance with Part F. The following explanations are simplified versions of the most common methods of interpreting the "Systems" approach set out in the provisions section of the Regulation.

Background ventilators are now measured in equivalent area (mm² EA) which is a better measure of performance but does not directly relate to the physical size of the opening through the ventilator.

- System 1 - Intermittent extract fans and background ventilators
- System 2 - [Deleted] 2022
- System 3 - Continuous mechanical extract and background ventilators
- System 4 - Continuous mechanical supply and extract with heat recovery

=== Part G. Sanitation, hygiene and water efficiency ===
Adequate sanitation facilities i.e. toilet.

A house must have either a bath or shower with the ability to heat hot water.

A dwelling must have a 'potable' (cold) water supply suitable for drinking.

Unvented hot water storage systems – restrictions apply to who can install the system.

=== Part H. Drainage and waste disposal ===
An adequate system must be in place to carry waste water used for cooking, washing, toilet (flushing), bath or shower to a foul sewer, cesspool or settlement tank.

A cesspool or settlement tank must be impermeable to liquids and have adequate ventilation. It must also have means of access for emptying, not harm the health of any person and not contaminate water or water supply.

An adequate system to carry rainwater away from the roof of a building e.g. guttering carrying water to a suitable final outfall or surface water sewer.

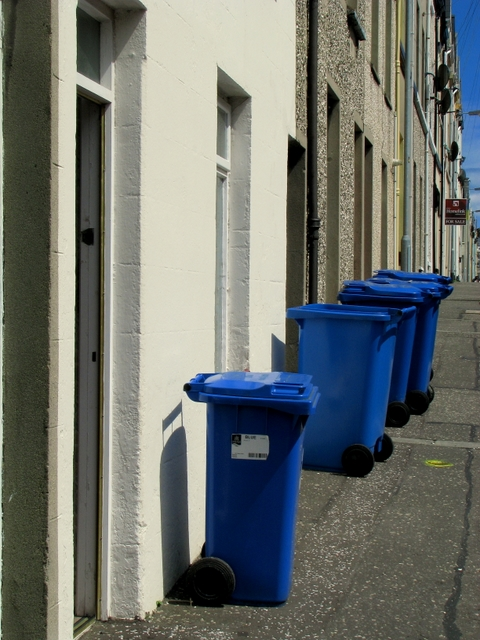
Wheelie bins are used for solid waste collection in the UK.

A place to put a wheelie bin or dustbin and a recycling bin. The place must not harm anyone's health.

=== Part J. Combustion appliances and fuel storage systems ===
Must have an adequate air supply for combustion and for efficient working of a flue pipe or chimney.

Appliances shall discharge the products of combustion to the outside.

The appliance, fireplace and chimney shall reduce the risk of the building catching fire.

Fuel storage, for oil and/or LPG, must not increase the risk to a building from a fire.

See Part B for general fire safety.

=== Part K. Protection from falling, collision and impact ===
Part K sets minimum standards for the safety of stairways, ramps and ladders, together with requirements for balustrading, windows, and vehicle barriers to prevent falling from floor edges, roofs, or balconies, etc.

Glass and glazing safety is also covered. Also included are requirements for guarding where there is a risk of falling, pedestrian and vehicle barriers, and requirements to prevent injury from (opening) doors and windows.

Glazing that people come into contact with whilst in a building, should, if broken, break in a way unlikely to cause injury, resist impact without breaking or be shielded or protected from impact.

Buildings, other than dwellings that have transparent glazing which people come into contact with while moving around a building, must have features to make it apparent.

Windows that can be opened must be operated safely and provision made for safe accessible cleaning.

Part K also includes safety requirements relating to the use, operation, and cleaning of windows

Part K also includes safety requirements (including preventing entrapment and the crushing of persons) for automatic doors, barriers, shutters and gates.

=== Part L. Conservation of fuel and power ===
Approved documents L1 is specific to dwellings and L2 relates to all buildings other than dwellings.

As of 6 April 2006 (2010) (2014) split into four sections:

- L1A New dwellings
- L1B Existing dwellings
- L2A New buildings other than dwellings
- L2B Existing buildings other than dwellings

Part L controls the insulation values of building elements, the allowable area of windows, doors and other openings, air permeability of the structure, the heating efficiency of boilers and the insulation and controls for heating appliances and systems together with hot water storage and lighting efficiency. It also sets out the requirements for SAP (Standard Assessment Procedure) calculations and carbon emission targets for dwellings.

Regulation 16 requires the advertising of the SAP rating in all new dwellings, and in the EPC document.

Approved Document L1 is supported by a set of 'robust' construction details, now known as "Accredited Construction Details", which focus on ways of limiting air leakage and thermal bridging in construction. By using these tried and tested details, expensive on-site testing can be avoided.

In addition to insulation requirements and limitation of openings of the building fabric, this part considers solar heating and heat gains to structures, it controls heating, mechanical ventilation and air conditioning systems, lighting efficiency, space heating controls, air permeability, solar emission, the certification, testing and commissioning of heating and ventilation systems, and requirements for energy meters.

Air permeability is measured by air tightness testing for new dwellings (based on a sampling regime), all new buildings other than dwellings and large extensions to buildings other than dwellings.

These four Approved Documents must be read in conjunction with the supplemental official and industry documents (the 'second tier' guidance documents).

==== Energy Performance Certificate (EPC) ====
All EPCs will be based on SAP 2009 calculations from 1 April 2011. It is highly unlikely that many dwellings built to Part L 2010 will be completed before 1 April 2011. However, in the event that any are, the EPC will need to be produced using SAP 2005.

Please note that all plots require a building control approval submission, and EPC regardless of how many identical properties are to be built in the same development.

==== Part L new requirements ====
Lighting, ventilation, solar heat gain and possible overheating will all impact on the potential to hit the 25% reduction target but until now have not really troubled the industry. As U-values falls (see table) and airtightness levels increases, heat loss through 'thermal bridges' becomes more significant. The new regulations give these issues more emphasis. They also require designs to avoid unwanted solar gains, leading to excessive summer temperatures. The need now exists to consider these issues at the design stage.

See also:

- Energy efficiency in British housing
- iSBEM
- National Home Energy Rating

=== Part M. Access to and use of buildings ===
Part M requires the inclusive provision of ease of access to and circulation within all buildings, together with requirements for facilities for disabled people.

Buildings should have reasonable provision:

- For all people to gain access and use the building.
- Toilets provision shall be made available for all.
- If a building has seating such as audience or spectator seating, reasonable provision should be made for people with disabilities.

The Equality Act 2010 imposed duties on service providers, schools and public bodies in relation to access for people with disabilities. However, the Part M approved document is not written as a means of ensuring compliance with these legal duties. It is written to ensure that the design of a building does not create physical barriers to a building's inclusive use, over its lifetime.

Part M of the Building Regulations relates to the 'Access to and Use of Buildings' and draws largely on the legislation covered by the Disability Discrimination Act 1995 and the Disability Discrimination (Employment) Regulations 1996 (SI 1996/1456).

This document is particularly relevant to new build where such properties must comply. If in any doubt as to whether your alterations are affected by this document, the local building control department will be able to assist further. Later alterations of a building must not remove or reduce its accessibility features.

=== Part N. Glazing – safety in relation to impact, opening and cleaning ===
Part N was repealed in 2013 and these measures were moved into a new consolidated Part K in 2013 (See above).

=== Part O. Overheating ===
In 2022, Part O came into force dealing with overheating mitigation.

=== Part P. Electrical safety – dwellings ===
New rules for electrical safety in the home, the garden and its outbuildings came into effect on 1 January 2005. This part only applies to dwellings, or, in some cases, buildings that would be exempt but which take their electrical supply from a dwelling. Several government approved competent persons schemes support Part P. The current edition of Part P came into effect on 6 April 2013, reducing the range of electrical work which needs to be notified. The current edition applies to all work commenced from April 2013.

Reasonable provision shall be made in the design, installation, inspection and testing of electrical installations in order to protect persons from fire or injury.

Sufficient information shall be provided so that persons wishing to operate, maintain or alter an electrical installation can do so with reasonable safety.

Certain types of work require notification to the local authority for building control. In England this is only work within 'Zone 1' of a bathroom, and new consumer units and complete new circuits. In Wales, there are more 'notifiable works' including wiring in kitchens and gardens. Installers who are members of an approved "Competent Persons Scheme" may carry out such electrical work without the need to submit many such formal building regulations applications, instead notification is performed via their trade body.

=== Part Q. Security ===
In 2015 a new requirement, Part Q, came into force.

Part Q requires minimum provision of security in a dwelling with reasonable provisions needing to have been made to resist unauthorised access to any dwelling or any part of a building from which access can be gained to a flat within the building.

=== Part R. Physical infrastructure for high speed electronic communications networks ===
Part R was introduced in 2016 and took effect at the beginning of 2017. It required "network termination points" in buildings to provide access to high-speed Internet access (Broadband) via fibre or copper, with a minimum speed of 30 megabits/sec connection. This requirement was updated in 2022 to require new dwellings to provide ultra-fast broadband (up to 1 gigabit/sec) connections.

- Volume 1 applies to new dwellings
- Volume 2 applies to all other new buildings, and existing buildings undergoing major renovations

=== Part S. Infrastructure for the charging of electric vehicles ===
From July 2022 new buildings and significant modifications to existing ones will need provision to charge electric cars. The formal requirements are as follows:

The erection of new residential buildings

S1.

(1) A new residential building with associated parking must have access to electric vehicle charge points as provided for in paragraph (2)

(2) The number of associated parking spaces which have access to electric vehicle charge points must be—(a)the total number of associated parking spaces, where there are fewer associated parking spaces than there are dwellings contained in the residential building; or(b)the number of associated parking spaces that is equal to the total number of dwellings contained in the residential building, where there are the same number of associated parking spaces as, or more associated parking spaces than, there are dwellings.

(3) Cable routes for electric vehicle charge points must be installed in any associated parking spaces which do not, in accordance with paragraph (2), have an electric vehicle charge point where—

(a) a new residential building has more than 10 associated parking spaces; and

(b) there are more associated parking spaces than there are dwellings contained in the residential building.

Dwellings resulting from a material change of use

S2. Where one or more dwellings with associated parking result from a building, or a part of a building, undergoing a material change of use at least one associated parking space for the use of each such dwelling must have access to an electric vehicle charge point.

Residential buildings undergoing major renovation

S3. Where a residential building undergoing major renovation will have more than 10 associated parking spaces after the major renovation is completed—

(a) at least one associated parking space for the use of each new dwelling must have access to an electric vehicle charge point;

(b) cable routes [ducts, etc.] for electric vehicle charge points must be installed in all additional associated parking spaces.

== Exempt buildings ==
All new buildings, unless in one of the following exempt classes, must meet the relevant requirements of the Building Regulations. (See Reg. No. 3)

Exempt buildings include:

- Class I: Buildings controlled under other legislation e.g. Any building in which explosives are manufactured or stored under a licence granted under the Manufacture and Storage of Explosives Regulations 2005 or nuclear-related buildings or an ancient monument.
- Class II: Buildings not frequented by people (unless close to an existing building).
- Class III: Greenhouses and agricultural buildings (not used for retail).
- Class IV: Temporary buildings (erected for less than 28 days).
- Class V: Ancillary buildings.
- Class VI: Small detached buildings (garages, garden storage sheds/huts) (less than 30 square metres floor area with no sleeping accommodation therein).
- Class VII: Extensions – porches, covered ways, conservatories, (less than 30 square metres floor area).

The Building Regulations 2000 (SI 2000/2531) have been amended five times since the original statutory instrument was published. A new consolidated edition was published in 2010 – the Building Regulations 2010 (SI 2010/2214). These have also now been amended five times since 2010. It is good practice to have exemption confirmed by the relevant local authority prior to starting construction works or alterations. The latest statutory instrument gives the full conditions of exemptions (and any newly controlled buildings).

Crown buildings (national government buildings and military buildings) are no longer totally exempt from the English Building Regulations. All Crown buildings must comply with the energy efficiency measures set out in Part L.

This is due to EU laws requiring higher energy efficiency in all buildings (new and existing) under European climate change measures such as the EU Energy Performance of Buildings Directive.

EU law requires public buildings to be "good energy practice" examples. BREXIT laws have not altered this "good energy practice" requirement.

New energy regulations have been made to fully implement these EU laws, where they fall outside the scope of the building regulations.

== Devolved administrations ==
=== Scotland ===
Most of the building regulations that apply in Scotland are set out in the Building (Scotland) Act 2003. Minor updates to building safety regulations were presented to the Scottish Parliament in 2023.

Provision was introduced in the Natural Environment (Scotland) Act 2026 to amend the regulations to provide for swift bricks to be incorporated in new buildings "where reasonably practicable and appropriate".

=== Wales ===
Updates to building safety regulations were presented to the National Assembly for Wales (in 2019) and the Senedd (in 2022).

=== Northern Ireland ===
A series of recommendations regarding building regulations were described in a report to the Department for Communities, but this has not been implemented yet.

== Proposals ==
- A proposal has been put forward for regulations to cover the carbon emissions embedded in buildings during their construction.

== See also ==
- Building code
- Building control body
- Building regulations approval
- Energy efficiency in British housing
- Equality and Human Rights Commission
- Eurocodes
- Housing in the United Kingdom
- Rebuilding of London Act 1666
