= Building control body =

Organisation authorised to oversee building work

A building control body is an organisation authorised by the Building Act 1984 (as amended 1 October 2023 by the Building Safety Act 2022) to control building work that is subject to the Building Regulations in England and Wales (similar systems are provided in Northern Ireland, and in Scotland where the term 'building standards' is used. Such regulations or standards are also known as the building codes in other parts of the world.

== Overview ==
Building control roles are exercised by public officers within local authorities and by private sector employees of Registered Building Control Approvers (RBCAs) which replaced the former "Approved Inspectors", once licensed by CICAIR Ltd, a body authorised by the Secretary of State for Housing, Communities and Local Government under the Building Act 1984 (as amended).

In England and Wales, each local authority is the "Local Building Control Authority" (LBCA). The collective term "Local Authority Building Control" (LABC) refers to the non-statutory organisation (a 'trade body') of that name representing all local authority building control services in England and Wales. LABC is controlled by its members - the local authorities. The LABC operates a range of generic websites offering "advice" and "information" of the Building Regulations, to both building industry professionals and the general public.

The title "building control officer" (BCO) (also known as a "building inspector" or a "building control surveyor") is used predominantly by local authorities, which confer the title of "officer" to many staff who have regulatory, supervision or enforcement roles.

In 2021, the House of Commons considered a draft Building Safety Bill to implement post Grenfell Tower fire inquiry recommendations for better safety in the erection of future higher-risk buildings, and better management of all existing (and all still under construction) higher-risk block of flats and student accommodation (over six floors or 18m above ground level). The Building Safety Act 2022 is now statute law in England.

Building Regulations are a devolved area of law and different administrative regime existing between the four nations that make up the United Kingdom of Great Britain (UK). Scotland has always had very different "building safety standards" under its separate Scottish legal system.

== Qualifications and appointment ==
The Building Safety Act 2022 created a regulated and legally protected profession for all building control professionals. To practice in the public sector with local authorities and/or in the private sector as employees of (RBCAs) companies or as self-employed individuals, all individual building control professionals must register with the Building Safety Regulator (BSR) a statutory body created by the Building Safety Act 2022. Thus, since 1 October 2023, it is a criminal offence to claim to be a RBI (Registered Building Inspector) unless registered with the BSR.

There are now three main non-statutory professional bodies - the Royal Institution of Chartered Surveyors (RICS), the Chartered Institute of Building (CIOB) and the Chartered Association of Building Engineers (CABE) - with members in the construction industry and local authority or private sector "building control".

In July 2019, there were 95 Approved Inspectors operating in the UK, but rising insurance premiums following the Grenfell disaster meant some could be forced out of business.

== Functions ==
The main function of building control is to ensure that the requirements of the building regulations are met in all types of non-exempt development. Generally they examine plans, specifications and other documents submitted for approval, and survey work as it proceeds. Most building control surveyors are now actively involved at design stage for many schemes and are acknowledged to provide valuable input at all stages of development.

Many building control surveyors who work for local authorities are involved with other legislation such as safety at sports grounds, dealing with dangerous structures and demolitions, and various development and building matters.

Local authorities (as the Local Building Control Authority) and the Building Safety Regulator have statutory powers under the Building Act 1984 (as amended by the Building Safety Act 2022) to administer and enforce compliance with the relevant requirements of the building regulations and to have work altered or removed that does not comply. These powers have not been conferred on anyone working in the private sector.

There is a clear legal duty on all RBIs to ensure compliance with the relevant requirements of the building regulations; a mandatory code of professional conduct must be followed.

=== Dutyholders ===
The Building Regulations 2010 were amended on 1 October 2023 to impose clear legal duties on all clients, designers (architects, etc) and contractors (builders, installers, specialists, etc) to comply with the relevant requirements of the Building Regulations 2010 [See the new "Part 2A of the Building Regulations 2010"].

== Organisations ==
Local Authority Building Control (LABC) is a non-statutory membership organisation representing the 370 local authority building control teams in England.

LABSS (Local Authority Building Standards Scotland) is a not-for-profit membership organisation representing all local authority building standards verifiers in Scotland.

Formed in 1996, the Association of Consultant Approved Inspectors (ACAI) promotes private sector building control as a commercial, professional and cost-effective alternative to local authority inspectors.

The ACAI and LABC joined with the CABE, CIOB and RICS to form the Building Control Alliance, incorporated in 2008. The Alliance was dissolved in 2018.

The Association of Registered Building Inspectors (ARBI) is currently being formed, by RBIs, following the new legislation, on 1 October 2023.

== See also ==
- Building regulations approval
- Building regulations in the United Kingdom
- Energy efficiency in British housing
- Planning permission in the United Kingdom
