= Oriented structural straw board =

Engineered board

Oriented structural straw board (OSSB) is an engineered board that is made by splitting straw and adding methylene diphenyl diisocyanate (MDI) and then heating and compressing layers in specific orientations. Research and development for OSSB panels began in the mid 1980s and was spearheaded by the Alberta Research Council, Canada (today AITF).

== Uses ==
OSSB can replace wood oriented strand board (OSB) and particle board in structural and non-structural applications, such as interior and exterior walls for house construction, furniture and interior decoration. OSSB panels are formaldehyde-free, they are also used for applications where air quality is a concern, such as kindergartens, hospitals, bedrooms, and hotels.

== Manufacturing ==
OSSB panel manufacturing starts with careful selection of straw fibres, which are then cut, cleaned, split and dried. Splitting straws allows resin to coat what would otherwise be the inside of a hollow straw. Producing split straw of sufficient length was the key technical innovation making OSSBs possible. OSSB is thus sometimes referred to as oriented split straw board. Formaldehyde free resin is added to the straw and the fibres are oriented for strength and appearance, and shaped into a mat through directional mat forming. The mat is then pressed between heated belts, water is vaporized, transferring heat into the straw. The heat cures the adhesive and causes a series of physical and chemical changes to the pressurized raw materials, which harden the final product.

== Properties ==
OSSB panels have high structural strength, load bearing and stability in both directions, as well as superior workability and excellent nail-holding properties on all sides. Water-permeability-treated OSSB panels are more water-resistant than treated conventional wood-panel boards because they have no internal gaps or voids. OSSB panels are also highly earthquake-resistant. The resin used to manufacture OSSB is p-MDI, which does not emit formaldehyde (a volatile organic compound, VOC). The raw material can be treated by various borate compounds, which are toxic to termites, beetles, molds, fungi and mammals, but only at higher concentrations.

== See also ==
- Oriented strand board
