= Home Builders Federation =

House building trade association

- Abbreviation: HBF
- Formation: 1939; 87 years ago
- Type: Trade association
- Legal status: Non-profit company
- Purpose: Representing the home building industry in the UK
- Headquarters: London, United Kingdom
- Region served: England and Wales
- Members: Private sector house-builders
- Website: hbf.co.uk

The Home Builders Federation (HBF) is a British trade association representing private sector homebuilders in England and Wales. As of 2016, its members delivered around 80% of new homes built each year.

== History ==
The HBF can trace its roots back to 1939 and the establishment of the National Association of House Builders.

This became the Federation of Registered House Builders in 1946 (representing the housing element of the National Federation of Building Trades Employers, NFBTE, in whose annual reports its activities were described). In 1970, the federation became the House Builders Federation.

From 1997 to 2000, it was part of the NFBTE successor umbrella organisation, the Construction Confederation, but started to withdraw in 2000, voting in 2001 to terminate its membership by January 2003.

It changed its name to the Home Builders Federation in 2005.

== Members ==
HBF members include national names (e.g. Barratt Redrow, Bellway, Cala Homes and Persimmon) and smaller regional or local businesses, plus Registered Social Landlords, suppliers and companies who provide professional services to the home building industry.

== Activities ==
The HBF represents member interests on a national and regional level, addressing technical issues (e.g. regulations and standards), planning issues, and health and safety, among other areas.

For example, in February 2022, it accused the UK government of not working "constructively" to resolve the post-Grenfell cladding and fire safety crisis, and of hurling "clearly not proportionate" threats against the housing industry. In July 2022, the HBF wrote to the Department for Levelling Up, Housing and Communities, unhappy about the commitments its members were being asked to make regarding remediation of unsafe cladding.

It also represents home building interests by attending meetings of the Strategic Forum for Construction.
