= Building Safety Regulator =

The Building Safety Regulator (BSR) is a non-departmental public body of the Ministry of Housing, Communities and Local Government and is responsible for regulating higher-risk buildings in England.

== History ==
The BSR was established to raise safety standards for buildings in England in response to the Grenfell Tower tragedy in June 2017. Following the passing of the Building Safety Act 2022, it was initially formed on 1 October 2023 within the Health and Safety Executive (HSE). The BSR became a standalone regulator on 27 January 2026.

The BSR's office is in Bootle, Merseyside.
