= Competent person =

Person responsible for company's health and safety

A competent person is designated by a company to ensure that the company's health and safety responsibilities are being met. This may be a legal obligation required of the company, to ensure that the business understands, and can act on, the health and safety risks that might occur during their particular type of work.

== United Kingdom ==
The forerunner to the Competent Person Scheme in the UK was the 1991 Building Regulations Act, which enabled gas-heating appliance installers to self-certify that their work was safe and legal, rather than needing external checking. Then from 2002 to 2010, a series of Competent Person Schemes were implemented widely in the building sector to enable builders to self-certify that their work meets regulations in eighteen different fields. By 2019, an estimated 85% of all building work requiring the notification of building control bodies was self-certified, and therefore no longer subject to external inspection. In 2012, a UK government report found that 'although the reports received indicate that most schemes have been operating effectively and have proved to be a success, the latest report in 2009 found that some schemes were not complying fully with their conditions of authorisation or achieving a sufficiently high level of compliance with the Building Regulations'.

Recognition of competence is defined as requiring "sufficient training and experience or knowledge and other qualities" to be able to effectively oversee health and safety in the business, although specialised industries may have additional, more specific requirements.

For building trades, there are, as of February 2020, eighteen Competent Person Schemes including:

- Fensa (for windows)
- HETAS (for biomass and solid fuel)
- NICEIC (for electrical installations)

== United States ==
While the U.S. Occupational Safety and Health Administration (OSHA) does not have specific standards about competent persons, several industry-specific standards do have requirements for the designated competent persons to follow. These standards address multiple aspects of construction, gear certification, longshoring, shipyards, as well as general industry.
