= Building Act 1984 =

Act of the Parliament of the United Kingdom

Building Act 1984 (Note: Section 135(1).)
- Act of Parliament
- Parliament of the United Kingdom
- Long title: An Act to consolidate certain enactments concerning building and buildings and related matters.
- Citation: 1984 c. 55
- Territorial extent: England and Wales (Note: Section 135(2).)

Dates
- Royal assent: 31 October 1984
- Commencement: various (Note: Section 134.)

Other legislation
- Amends: Public Health (Control of Disease) Act 1984; See § Repealed enactments
- Amended by: Housing (Consequential Provisions) Act 1985; Airports Act 1986; Statute Law (Repeals) Act 1989; Clean Air Act 1993; Radioactive Substances Act 1993; Statute Law (Repeals) Act 1993; Statute Law (Repeals) Act 2004; Postal Services Act 2011; Infrastructure Act 2015; Building Safety Act 2022
- Relates to: Building (Scotland) Act 2003

Status: Amended

Text of statute as originally enacted

Revised text of statute as amended

Text of the Building Act 1984 as in force today (including any amendments) within the United Kingdom, from legislation.gov.uk.

The Building Act 1984 (c. 55) is an act of the Parliament of the United Kingdom consolidating previous legislation concerning the construction process, and the design and specifications for buildings and their component parts, and related matters, in England and Wales. The Welsh Government may make its own building regulations for Wales under the act.

This act does not extend to Scotland or Northern Ireland, which both have similar but differing legislation.

The act permits detailed regulations to be made by the UK Secretary of State and/or the Welsh Ministers (of the Senedd). The building regulations made under the Building Act 1984 have been periodically updated, rewritten or consolidated, with the latest and current version being the Building (Amendment) Regulations 2016 (SI 2016/490).

More minor amendments have been issued, for example in 2019 and 2020 in respect of enhanced fire safety measures. (Building Regulation 7(2) placed a ban on the use of combustible materials in external walls, of high-risk buildings – over (six floors) 18 metres high).

Following the Grenfell Tower Fire of 2017, in which 72 people died in a 24-floor block of flats (without sprinklers and combustible external wall materials had been recently added to the block – for improved energy-efficiency and other building management reasons), an independent review into Building Regulations and fire safety was commissioned by the UK Government and chaired by Dame Judith Hackitt. The review's report was published on 17 May 2018.

The UK Government surveyed 1,200 recently erected "high-rise" buildings and it was found that far too many were in fact not compliant with the pre-2017 fire safety requirements of the English building regulations. The government has now ordered many of these "dangerous" higher-risk buildings to be "remediated".

The government has asked many more 'older' high-rise building owners to examine their stock for safety risks. Some 12,000 blocks have now been reviewed.

Local housing authorities and regional fire authorities have been instructed to ensure remediation of recently erected blocks is carried out as quickly as possible.

== Provisions ==
=== Power to make regulations ===
S.1 Power to make building regulations

The Secretary of State (or The Welsh Assembly) may for any purposes of :

(a) securing the health, safety, welfare and convenience of persons regards buildings
(b) conserving fuel and power
(c) preventing waste, undue consumption, or contamination of water
(d) protecting or enhancing the environment
(e) facilitating sustainable development or
(f) preventing and detecting crime

make building regulations in respect of:

(a) the design and construction of buildings
(b) the demolition of buildings
(c) services, fittings and equipment provided in or in connection with buildings.

The powers to make building regulations have been amended and extended in their scope by two recent Acts of Parliament; the Sustainable and Secure Buildings Act 2004 and the Climate Change and Sustainable Energy Act 2006. The latter Act also alters and extends the enforcement powers of local building control authorities, in England and Wales. The Building Act 1984 is to be greatly altered in both its scope and its enforcement powers, by the forthcoming "Building Safety Act 2021".

The legal obligation to ensure controlled building work does comply with the requirements of the building regulations will to be shared between more defined "individual dutyholders". Enforcement powers will be available for use by a building control authority for up to ten years after any offence.

=== Repealed enactments ===
Section 133(2) of the act repealed 24 enactments, listed in schedule 7 to the act.

Enactments repealed by section 133(2)
Citation	Short title	Extent of repeal
26 Geo. 5 & 1 Edw. 8. c. 49	Public Health Act 1936	Section 25.
26 Geo. 5 & 1 Edw. 8. c. 49	Public Health Act 1936	Sections 37 to 41.
26 Geo. 5 & 1 Edw. 8. c. 49	Public Health Act 1936	Sections 43 and 44.
26 Geo. 5 & 1 Edw. 8. c. 49	Public Health Act 1936	Sections 46 and 47.
26 Geo. 5 & 1 Edw. 8. c. 49	Public Health Act 1936	Sections 53 to 62.
26 Geo. 5 & 1 Edw. 8. c. 49	Public Health Act 1936	Sections 64 to 67.
26 Geo. 5 & 1 Edw. 8. c. 49	Public Health Act 1936	Sections 70 and 71.
26 Geo. 5 & 1 Edw. 8. c. 49	Public Health Act 1936	Section 88.
26 Geo. 5 & 1 Edw. 8. c. 49	Public Health Act 1936	Section 90 (3) and (6).
26 Geo. 5 & 1 Edw. 8. c. 49	Public Health Act 1936	Sections 137 and 138.
26 Geo. 5 & 1 Edw. 8. c. 49	Public Health Act 1936	Section 142.
26 Geo. 5 & 1 Edw. 8. c. 49	Public Health Act 1936	Section 344.
7 & 8 Geo. 6. c. 31	Education Act 1944	Section 63(1).
8 & 9 Geo. 6. c. 42	Water Act 1945	Sections 29 and 30.
8 & 9 Geo. 6. c. 42	Water Act 1945	In Schedule 4, the seventh paragraph.
10 & 11 Geo. 6. c. 51	Town and Country Planning Act 1947	In Schedule 8, the amendment of the Public Health Act 1936.
2 & 3 Eliz. 2. c. 32	Atomic Energy Authority Act 1954	Section 5(5).
8 & 9 Eliz. 2. c. 34	Radioactive Substances Act 1960	In Schedule 1, in paragraph 3 the word "thirty-nine,".
9 & 10 Eliz. 2. c. 64	Public Health Act 1961	Sections 4 to 11.
9 & 10 Eliz. 2. c. 64	Public Health Act 1961	Sections 19 to 21.
9 & 10 Eliz. 2. c. 64	Public Health Act 1961	Sections 23 to 33.
9 & 10 Eliz. 2. c. 64	Public Health Act 1961	Schedule 1.
1963 c. 33	London Government Act 1963	In Schedule 9, in Part II paragraph 18, and in Part III paragraphs 13 to 15.
1963 c. 33	London Government Act 1963	In Schedule 11, in Part I, in paragraph 11 the words ", section 41 of this Act", paragraphs 12, 21 and 34 to 36, and in Part II paragraphs 2 and 3.
1967 c. xx	Greater London Council (General Powers) Act 1967	Section 25.
1971 c. 40	Fire Precautions Act 1971	Sections 13(5), 15, 30(1) and 40(7).
1972 c. 70	Local Government Act 1972	In Schedule 14, in paragraph 4 the words "41, 46,", and paragraph 10.
1973 c. 37	Water Act 1973	Section 14(6) and (7).
1973 c. 37	Water Act 1973	In Schedule 8, in paragraph 36, in sub-paragraph (1)(a) the words from "and sections " to "Middle Temple) ", sub-paragraph (1)(b), and in sub-paragraph (2) the words from "except" to the end, and paragraphs 38, 41 and 42.
1974 c. 37	Health and Safety at Work etc. Act 1974	Sections 61 to 74.
1974 c. 37	Health and Safety at Work etc. Act 1974	Section 76.
1974 c. 37	Health and Safety at Work etc. Act 1974	Schedules 5 and 6.
1974 c. 37	Health and Safety at Work etc. Act 1974	In Schedule 10, the items relating to the Public Health Act 1936, the Town and Country Planning Act 1947, the Atomic Energy Authority Act 1954, the Public Health Act 1961, the Airports Authority Act 1965 and the Civil Aviation Act 1971.
1974 c. 40	Control of Pollution Act 1974	Section 28(2).
1974 c. 40	Control of Pollution Act 1974	In section 61(2), the words "under Part II of the Public Health Act 1936 ".
1974 c. 40	Control of Pollution Act 1974	In Schedule 2, paragraph 10.
1975 c. 78	Airports Authority Act 1975	Section 19(2).
1976 c. 57	Local Government (Miscellaneous Provisions) Act 1976	Section 34.
1977 c. 45	Criminal Law Act 1977	In Schedule 6, the entries relating to offences under sections 60(1) and 59(4) of the Public Health Act 1936.
1977 c. xv	City of London (Various Powers) Act 1977	Section 25.
1980 c. 20	Education Act 1980	In sections 14(4) and 27(5), the words "section 71(a) of the Public Health Act 1936 and ".
1980 c. 66	Highways Act 1980	Section 112(8).
1980 c. 66	Highways Act 1980	In section 114(4), the words from "and nothing " to the end of the subsection.
1981 c. 12	Water Act 1981	Section 5.
1982 c. 16	Civil Aviation Act 1982	In Schedule 2, paragraph 1(1).
1982 c. 30	Local Government (Miscellaneous Provisions) Act 1982	Section 8(1).
1982 c. 30	Local Government (Miscellaneous Provisions) Act 1982	Sections 24 and 25.
1982 c. 30	Local Government (Miscellaneous Provisions) Act 1982	Section 28.
1984 c. 29	Housing and Building Control Act 1984	Sections 39 to 59.
1984 c. 29	Housing and Building Control Act 1984	Section 60(2)(b).
1984 c. 29	Housing and Building Control Act 1984	Section 61.
1984 c. 29	Housing and Building Control Act 1984	In section 62(1), the definitions of "contravention" and "local authority ".
1984 c. 29	Housing and Building Control Act 1984	Section 62(2).
1984 c. 29	Housing and Building Control Act 1984	Section 66(2).
1984 c. 29	Housing and Building Control Act 1984	In section 66(3), the words "Except as provided by subsection (2) above,".
1984 c. 29	Housing and Building Control Act 1984	Schedules 8 to 10.
1984 c. 29	Housing and Building Control Act 1984	In Schedule 11, paragraphs 4, 5 and 35.

== Subsequent developments ==
On 20 July 2020, a new draft "Building Safety Act" was published, for public consultation, and the Building Safety Bill was introduced into the House of Commons on 5 July 2021. This was enacted into statute law on 28 April 2022 and will greatly alter the scope and remit of the existing legislation.

The bill defines "higher-risk" (high-rise) as those blocks of flats "with 6 floors or more" or those blocks of flats "over 18m high", whichever occurs first.

The new law (act) heavily amends and extends the Building Act 1984 and for example, abolishes "approved inspectors", creating a single state register for all building control inspectors (with 'legal duties' now being at the individual and personal level of professional and legal responsibility) and creates a new national Building Safety Regulator (BSR).

The act creates several new criminal offences – including one of impersonating a registered building control inspector.

The act creates new building control authorities – initially at the district or unitary local authority level.

The act confirms the new national Building Safety Regulator will be a building control authority for all "higher-risk" buildings. (Residential buildings with two or more flats over 18 metres high).

The national regulator will be the sole building control authority for 'higher-risk' (high-rise) buildings. All existing and under construction, "higher-risk" (high-rise – over 18m high) buildings are to be transferred to the "National Building Safety Regulator" jurisdiction.

All "higher-risk" buildings will have to register with the BSR and prove (over the whole-lifetime of the building) that they are still safe to use and occupy and monitor the "higher-risk" building's fire and structural safety features and systems, to keep this safety case registered with the national regulator (for England). Periodic re-registration (with the BSR) will be required for all high-risk buildings.

The new law will also alter the Architect Registration Board's operational rules to require all 'architects' to undertake annual CPD and competency training for the whole of their "practising career".

Developers, designers and contractors will no longer be able to choose their "regulator".

The national regulator will also have powers to test and/or ban any building material or building product, which it knows is "unsafe" or "non-compliant" with the "requirements of the Building Regulations". The national regulator will also have powers to require all claims made about the performance or nature of a building product or material to be truthful and supported by 'up-to-date' scientific testing.

The devolved Welsh Government has welcomed the draft Building Safety Bill, and will legislate for it to apply (with some Welsh amendments) to future building work within the nation of Wales.

== Scotland ==
Scotland has its own Building (Scotland) Act 2003 and its own Building (Procedures) (Scotland) Regulations 2004.
