= Certificate of Conformity (Russia) =

Document showing safety and quality

Sample certificate

In Russia, a Certificate of Conformity, also called a Quality Certificate, Safety Certificate or Customs Certificate, affirms that a product or service conforms to legal safety and quality requirements. There are two types of certificate: one demonstrates conformity to the national standards known as GOST, and the other to a particular technical regulation. Certification may take place on either a mandatory or a voluntary basis. The certificate may be obtained: under contract; per consignment; or for serial production of commercial products.

== Types ==
There are two types of Conformity Certificate in Russia: the GOST Certificate of Conformity to National Standards, and the Certificate of Conformity to a Technical Regulation. The explanation of this is that the Technical Regulations began to be developed and enforced only recently, and do not yet fully regulate the certification process in Russia. Until the Technical Regulations replace the GOST Standards, the latter continue to play a part in the certification process on the Russian territory. It should also mentioned proving correspondence to Technical Conditions (TC), but generally this method is used in voluntary certification.

== Mandatory and voluntary certification ==
Manufacturers may obtain the Certificate of Conformity to Technical Regulation in mandatory or voluntary form. In voluntary certification it is the manufacturer who chooses the parameters on which to certificate. That is the reason why voluntary certification is used by large manufacturers and trade representatives for proving the correspondence of their product to the technical requirements, as well as to additional GOST standards which are not used in obligatory certification.

== Period of validity ==
The Certificate of Conformity to Technical Regulation may be given only by an authorized organ in the sphere of certification. The document may be given for the period of 1, 2 or 3 years in the case of series production. If the certificate is given for the party of the products, its term is unlimited. Such type of certification is typical for the parties of foreign products that are delivered into the Russian territory according invoice or a contract.

== The schemes of certification ==
The certificate may be obtained: under contract; per consignment; or for serial production of commercial products.

=== Scheme 1 ===
Certificate of Conformity to Technical Regulation may be drawn up according to the contract. In this case the certificate must contain the date and details of product tests (the date and the number of the testing protocol). The certificate of this type generally includes the correct name of the Certificate Receiver and the Product Manufacturer, the date and the number of the contract and the scheme of certification. Certificate of Conformity to Technical Regulation is generally drawn up in the case when the import is not limited to a one-time delivery of the products. After drawing up such a document the applicant may import their product for a period of one year.

=== Scheme 2 ===
The Certificate of Conformity to Technical Regulation may be drawn up for the party of products. In such case there is no need in drawing up the testing protocol, but the certificate must include the date and the number of invoice. Such kind of certificates is drawn up when importing the test party of some type of product because it is valid only for a limited party of goods. The Correspondence Certificate is provided with the open date. Generally, this kind of certificate is given, for example, for equipment.

=== Scheme 3 ===
Certificate of Conformity to Technical Regulation for the serial output of production may be drawn up only after certification tests. It is valid from one to three years. This kind of document may be drawn up by both Russian and foreign manufacturers.

== Process for obtaining the Certificate ==
It is possible to receive the Certificate of Conformity to Technical Regulation after providing the documents package to the certification center. One of the necessary documents required for certification is the test protocol. The document may be given by any laboratory authorized for certification tests after testing the products for correspondence to legislative requirements. Generally certification laboratories check the products for environmental and consumer safety as well as they correspond to the claimed characteristics mentioned in technical documentation to the real characteristics.

=== Documents needed for the certification process ===
==== Serially manufactured products ====
- The application for the certification;
- Brief description of the product;
- The documents proving the property or lending of the manufacturing premises;
- The normative-technical documentation for the products (The GOST or TC);
- The Statute of the Enterprise;
- The TIN certificate of registration in the Taxation Department;
- The state registration certificate;

==== Imported products delivered under contract ====
- The application for the certification;
- The description of the products;
- The TIN certificate of registration in the Taxation Department;
- The state registration certificate;
- The Statute of the Enterprise;
- The copy of the contract.

==== Serially manufactured imported products ====
- The application for the certification;
- The document proving the quality;
- The description of the products (appearance, field of use, technical characteristics).
